= Abu Qatifa =

Umayyad poet

Abū Qaṭīfa ʿAmr ibn al-Walīd ibn ʿUqba ibn Abī Muʿayt (died before 693) was an Umayyad poet in Medina. He is known for his verses preserved in the 10th-century Kitab al-aghani, especially his poem longing for Medina, from where he was exiled with the Umayyads in 680. The poem was set to music by the 8th-century composer Ma'bad and was one in the collection of the top one hundred songs commissioned by the Abbasid caliph Harun al-Rashid.

== Life and family ==
Abu Qatifa Amr was a son of al-Walid ibn Uqba from a collateral line of the Umayyad dynasty. Like most other Umayyads, he was exiled from Medina to Syria by the anti-Umayyad caliph Abd Allah ibn al-Zubayr in 683. Abu Qatifa was married to his distant Umayyad cousin, Maryam al-Sughra, a daughter of the third Rashidun caliph Uthman (r. 644–656). He divorced her, after which she married another distant cousin, Sa'id ibn al-As. Abu Qatifa died around 690.

Abu Qatifa's son, from a different wife, Muhammad (known as Dhu al-Shama, lit. 'the one with the birthmark', Dhu al-Qatifa, lit. 'the hairy one', and referred to as 'Ibn Amr' by the poet al-Farazdaq), fought in the army of the Umayyad prince and general Maslama ibn Abd al-Malik when it suppressed the revolt of Yazid ibn al-Muhallab in Iraq in 720. Muhammad was appointed by Maslama, who had become governor of Iraq, as his lieutenant governor of Kufa in 720 and was dismissed from his post following Maslama's replacement by Umar ibn Hubayra in 721–722.

Descendants of Abu Amr ibn Umayya (Banu Abi Mu'ayt)

Umayya
Harb	Abu al-As	Abu Amr Dhakwan	Al-As	Abu al-Is
Sufyanids	Uthmanids	Marwanids	Abu Mu'ayt Aban	Musafir	Abu Wajza
Uqba	al-Harith
Umara	Umm Kulthum	al-Walid	Hisham	Khalid
Aban	Ya'la	Abu Qatifa Amr	Hisham	Uthman	Khalid
Muhammad (Dhu al-Shama)	al-Walid	Khalid
Yusuf
Abdallah al-Mu'ayti

Dashed line indicates skipped generation(s)
Italicized indicates other Umayyad families/lineages
Third Rashidun caliph Uthman (r. 644–656) and descendants
Ruling dynasty of Umayyad Caliphate, 661–684
Ruling dynasty of Umayyad Caliphate, 684–750

== Poetry ==
Abu Qatifa was not an exceptional poet but he and his poetry are given prime place in the 10th-century Kitab al-aghani (Book of Songs) by Abu al-Faraj al-Isfahani. Abu Qatifa's verse expressing nostalgia of Medina's old landmarks had been set to music by one of the Umayyad era's best known composers, Ma'bad, and this was recognized by Abu al-Faraj as the Kitab's top song. It was among one hundred songs catalogued on the orders of Abbasid caliph Harun al-Rashid (r. 786–809). The verse, which historian Hilary Kilpatrick notes forms part of both the Umayyad family's and the early Muslim community's history, laments Abu Qatifa's exile from his hometown. In response to the poem, Ibn al-Zubayr invited Abu Qatifa to return to Medina. It is translated from Arabic as follows:

Dearer to my heart than the gates of Jayrūn
are the palace, the palm grove and between them al-Jammāʾ,
and close by the palace the houses called Qarāʾin –
dwellings far removed from depravity or shame.
Though people hide their secrets, I know them;
But what I conceal they’ll never learn till I die. (Note: "the gates of Jayrun" refers to a place in Damascus, while the "palm grove"and "al-Jamma" refer to estates in Medina owned successively by the Umayyad statesman Sa'id ibn al-As (d. 679) and the Umayyad caliph Mu'awiya I (r. 661–680).)

Other verses of Abu Qatifa recorded in the Kitab include lamentations of his ex-wife Maryam's remarriage to Sa'id ibn al-As and his Umayyad kinsman Sa'id ibn Uthman's killing by his Soghdian slaves in Medina and a plea to his father, then governor of Kufa, to send him a slave woman to satisfy his sexual frustrations.

== Bibliography ==
- Ahmed, Asad Q. (2011). The Religious Elite of the Early Islamic Ḥijāz: Five Prosopographical Case Studies. Oxford: University of Oxford Linacre College Unit for Prosopographical Research. ISBN 978-1-900934-13-8.
- Caskel, Werner (1966). Ğamharat an-nasab: Das genealogische Werk des His̆ām ibn Muḥammad al-Kalbī, Volume I (in German). Leiden: Brill. OCLC 490272940.
- Kilpatrick, Hilary (2003). Making the Great Book of Songs Compilation and the Author's Craft in Abū L-Faraj Al-Iṣbahānī's Kitāb Al-aghānī. London and New York: RoutledgeCurzon. ISBN 0-7007-1701-3.
- Kilpatrick, Hilary (2010). "ʿUmar ibn ʿAbd al-ʿAzīz, al-Walīd ibn Yazīd and their Kin: Images of the Umayyads in the Kitāb al-Aghānī". In Borrut, Antoine; Cobb, Paul M. (eds.). Umayyad Legacies: Medieval Memories from Syria to Spain. Leiden and Boston: Brill. pp. 63–88. ISBN 9789004184749.
- Powers, David S., ed. (1989). The History of al-Ṭabarī, Volume XXIV: The Empire in Transition: The Caliphates of Sulaymān, ʿUmar, and Yazīd, A.D. 715–724/A.H. 96–105. SUNY Series in Near Eastern Studies. Albany, New York: State University of New York Press. ISBN 978-0-7914-0072-2.
- Sawa, George Dimitri (2024). Mutʿat al-asmāʿ fī ʿilm al-samāʿ, The Ears’ Pleasure and the Science of Listening to Music by Aḥmad b. Yūsuf al-Tīfāshī al-Qafṣī (580-651/1184-1253). Leiden: Brill. ISBN 978-90-04-54277-8.
- Sezgin, Fuat (1975). Geschichte des arabischen schriftums, Band II, Poesie bis ca. 430H (in German). Leiden: Brill. ISBN 90-04-043764.
