= Na'ila bint al-Furafisa =

Wife of Uthman ibn Affan; hadith narrator

- نائلة بنت الفرافصة

Personal life
- Died: Medina
- Spouse: Uthman
- Children: Anbasa ibn Uthman; Maryam al-Sughra bint Uthman; Umm Aban al-Sughra bint Uthman; Umm Khalid bint Uthman; Arwa bint Uthman; Umm al-Banin bint Uthman
- Parent: al-Furafisa ibn Amr ibn Tha'laba (father)
- Relatives: Dabb ibn al-Furafisa (brother); Hind bint al-Furafisa (sister)

Religious life
- Religion: Islam

Na'ila bint al-Furafisa (Arabic: نائلة بنت الفرافصة, romanized: Nāʾila bint al-Furāfiṣa) was a noblewoman of the Banu Kalb tribe of Dumat al-Jandal and the wife of the third caliph, Uthman (r. 644–666). She is celebrated in Islamic tradition for her loyal stand alongside her husband when he was besieged and killed in his home in 656 and for helping rally the governor of Syria, Mu'awiya ibn Abi Sufyan, and his main backers, her Kalbite tribesmen, to seek revenge for Uthman's death.

== Ancestry ==
Na'ila was a daughter of al-Furafisa (also spelled 'al-Farafasa'), a chief of the Banu Kalb tribe's Banu Hisn ibn Damdam clan. He was a matrilineal descendant of Wabara ibn Rumanis, whose mother, Salma, was the daughter of Wa'il ibn al-Atiyya ibn Udays, the Jewish goldsmith of the Fadak oasis in northern Arabia. She and her family had been taken as captives when the Kalb conquered Fadak in the second half of the 6th century under al-Furafisa's paternal great-great-grandfather al-Harith ibn Hisn ibn Damdam (better known as 'al-Harsha'). Al-Furafisa was the inheritor of Fadak's goldsmith.

Al-Furafisa's father, al-Ahwas ibn Amr ibn Tha'laba, was the chief of the Kalb of the Dumat al-Jandal oasis (the successor of his brother al-Asbagh). Like his tribesmen in Dumat al-Jandal, al-Furafisa was a Christian. He died a Christian during Islamic rule (630s).

== Wife of Uthman ==
In 648–649 (28 AH), Na'ila was married to Caliph Uthman (r. 644–656). Her sister, Hind, had already been married to Uthman's cousin Sa'id ibn al-As and Na'ila's paternal first cousin, Tumadir bint al-Asbagh, had been married to a key Muslim leader, Abd al-Rahman ibn Awf; the latter relationship marked the first marriage between a Kalbite and a member of the Quraysh of Mecca, the tribe to which Uthman, Sa'id and Abd al-Rahman all belonged. The marriage between Na'ila and Uthman was facilitated by this Qurayshite connection. Since al-Furafisa remained a Christian, he had his Muslim son Dabb accompany Na'ila to Uthman, who gave her a dowry of 10,000 silver dirhams and gifted her his servants Kaysan Abu Salim and his wife Rummana, captives from Kirman.

The early Islamic tradition celebrates Na'ila for her loyal stand beside Uthman when he was besieged and killed in his home in the Islamic capital Medina on 17 June 656. In the chaotic aftermath, the burial of Uthman was delayed until enough men responded to Na'ila's pleas to carry it out. In the aftermath of his killing, Na'ila rallied Uthman's distant cousin, the governor of Syria Mu'awiya ibn Abi Sufyan and the Quda'a, the tribal confederation led by the Kalb on whose power Mu'awiya relied, to avenge Uthman's death. According to different reports in the tradition, she is said to have a written Mu'awiya a letter to the effect or to have sent Uthman's bloody clothes and her own amputated fingers to Mu'awiya's aide Nu'man ibn Bashir al-Ansari, who delivered them to Mu'awiya at his court in Damascus. Na'ila's efforts may have stirred the Syrians, including her Kalbite kin, to demand revenge for Uthman's killing and back Mu'awiya's in the civil war with Uthman's successor, Caliph Ali (r. 656–661).

== Children ==
Na'ila had four or five daughters with Uthman and one son. The daughters and their descendants generally married into the Banu Umayya clan of the Quraysh to which Uthman, Sa'id and Mu'awiya belonged and whose members ruled the caliphate from 661 to 750. Na'ila's daughters Maryam al-Sughra and Arwa were respectively married to the Umayyad poet Abu Qatifa and his brother Khalid, the sons of al-Walid ibn Uqba. Abu Qatifa divorced Maryam due to her temperment; she afterward married Sa'id ibn al-As, with whom she had a daughter, Amina, who married the Umayyad prince Khalid ibn Yazid. Na'ila's daughter Umm Khalid was married to the Umayyad noble, Abdallah ibn Khalid ibn Asid and her fourth daughter, Umm Aban al-Sughra, did not marry. The possible fifth daughter, Umm al-Banin, may not have been Na'ila's progeny, but rather a daughter by one of Uthman's concubines.

The son of Na'ila and Uthman, Anbasa, is mentioned in an isolated report by the 8th-century Hisham ibn al-Kalbi. While historian Wilferd Madelung deems Anbasa's historicity "unreliable", Asad Ahmed notes that a grandson of Anbasa, al-Mughira ibn Hatim ibn Anbasa, and his cousin Muhammad al-Dibaj, who supported the Hasanids during their rebellion against the Abbasids in 762.

== Bibliography ==
- Ahmed, Asad Q. (2011). The Religious Elite of the Early Islamic Ḥijāz: Five Prosopographical Case Studies. University of Oxford Linacre College Unit for Prosopographical Research. ISBN 978-1-900934-13-8.
- Caskel, Werner (1966a). Ğamharat an-nasab: Das genealogische Werk des His̆ām ibn Muḥammad al-Kalbī, Volume I (in German). Leiden: Brill. OCLC 490272940.
- Caskel, Werner (1966b). Ğamharat an-nasab: Das genealogische Werk des His̆ām ibn Muḥammad al-Kalbī, Volume II (in German). Leiden: Brill. OCLC 490272940.
- Kister, M. J. (2016) [1990]. "On the Wife of the Goldsmith of Fadak and her Progeny: A Study in Jāhilī Geneaological Traditions". Society and Religion from Jahiliyya to Islam (Reprint ed.). Abingdon, Oxon and New York: Routledge. pp. 321–330. ISBN 9780860782773.
- Mabra, Joshua (2017). Princely Authority in the Early Marwānid State: The Life of ʿAbd al-ʿAzīz ibn Marwān (d. 86/705). Piscataway, NJ: Gorgias Press. ISBN 978-1-4632-0632-1.
- Madelung, Wilferd (1997). The Succession to Muhammad: A Study of the Early Caliphate. Cambridge: Cambridge University Press. ISBN 0-521-56181-7.
- Wellhausen, Julius (1927). The Arab Kingdom and Its Fall. Translated by Margaret Graham Weir. Calcutta: University of Calcutta.
