= Arwa bint Kurayz =

Companion of Muhammad and Uthman's Mother

Arwa bint Kurayz أَرْوَى بِنْت كُرَيْز
- Born: Mecca, Hejaz, Arabia
- Died: Medina, Hejaz, Rashidun Caliphate
- Spouses: Affan ibn Abi al-As; Uqba ibn Abi Mu'ayt
- Children: Uthman ibn Affan; Al-Walid ibn Uqba; Umm Kulthum bint Uqba
- Parent(s): Kurayz ibn Rabi'a; Umm Hakim bint Abd al-Muttalib
- Relatives: Amir ibn Kurayz (brother); Arnab bint Kurayz (sister); Abd Allah ibn Amir (nephew)

Arwā bint Kurayz ibn Rabīʿa (Arabic: أروى بنت كريز بن ربيعة) was a maternal first cousin of the Islamic prophet Muhammad and the mother of Uthman, the third Rashidun caliph. Born into the Banu Abd Shams clan of Mecca, she embraced Islam, migrated to Medina, and died there during her son's caliphate.

== Life ==
Arwa was born to Kurayz ibn Rabi'a ibn Habib of the Banu Abd Shams and Umm Hakim bint Abd al-Muttalib, a paternal aunt of the Islamic prophet Muhammad, making her Muhammad's maternal first cousin. Alongside Arwa, her parents had three other children: Amir, Talha, and Umm Talha, who is also named Arnab in some sources.

She later married her paternal second cousin Affan ibn Abi al-As, with whom she had a son, the future caliph Uthman, and two daughters. Following Affan's death, she married Uqba ibn Abi Mu'ayt and bore him six children: al-Walid, Amara, Khalid, Umm Kulthum, Umm Hakim, and Hind. Arwa later embraced Islam, following her daughter Umm Kulthum in migrating to Medina, where she pledged allegiance to Muhammad and remained until her death during Uthman's caliphate.

== Bibliography ==
- Marsham, Andrew (2022). "Kinship, Dynasty and the Umayyads". The Historian of Islam at Work: Essays in Honor of Hugh N. Kennedy. Leiden: Brill. pp. 12–45. ISBN 978-90-04-52523-8.
- Landau-Tasseron, Ella, ed. (1998). The History of al-Ṭabarī, Volume XXXIX: Biographies of the Prophet's Companions and their Successors: al-Ṭabarī's Supplement to his History. SUNY Series in Near Eastern Studies. Albany, New York: State University of New York Press. ISBN 978-0-7914-2819-1.
- Ahmed, Asad Q. (2011). The Religious Elite of the Early Islamic Ḥijāz: Five Prosopographical Case Studies. University of Oxford Linacre College Unit for Prosopographical Research. ISBN 9781900934138.
- Ibn Sa'd, Muhammad (1995). Kitāb al-Ṭabaqāt al-Kabīr: The Women of Madina. Vol. 8. Translated by Aisha Bewley. London: Ta-Ha Publishers. ISBN 978-1-897940-24-2.
