= Al-Walid ibn Hisham al-Mu'ayti =

Umayyad Governor of Qinnasrin and General

Al-Walid ibn Hisham al-Mu'ayti الوليد بن هشام المعيطى

Governor of Jund Qinnasrin
- In office 717–720
- Monarch: Umar ibn Abd al-Aziz
- Preceded by: Marthad ibn Sharik al-Absi
- Succeeded by: Bishr ibn al-Walid

Personal details
- Parent: Hisham ibn al-Walid ibn Uqba (father)
- Relatives: Aban ibn al-Walid ibn Uqba (uncle)

Military service
- Allegiance: Umayyad Caliphate
- Branch/service: Umayyad army
- Rank: Commander
- Battles/wars: Arab–Byzantine wars; Umayyad invansions of Asia Minor

Al-Walīd ibn Hishām ibn al-Walīd ibn ʿUqba al-Muʿayṭī (Arabic: الوليد بن هشام بن الوليد بن عقبة المعيطي) (fl. 712/13 – c. 720) was a member of the Umayyad dynasty, a commander in the Arab–Byzantine wars and the governor of Jund Qinnasrin (northern Syria) under Caliph Umar ibn Abd al-Aziz (r. 717–720)

== Life ==
Al-Walid ibn Hisham was the grandson of al-Walid ibn Uqba from the Abu Mu'ayt line of the Umayyad clan. In 712/13 he led a raid into Byzantine territory as far as the fortress of Gazelon (called Ghazala by the Arabs) near Amasya in northern Anatolia. According to al-Waqidi, al-Walid alongside Amr ibn Qays al-Kindi led a further expedition against the Byzantines in 716/17, in the course of which several Arab troops from the army of Antioch were slain. He reached as far as the outskirts of Constantinople, where he killed a number of the inhabitants and took several captives. This was during the initial stages of the great Umayyad assault on Constantinople, led by Maslama ibn Abd al-Malik.

Caliph Umar ibn Abd al-Aziz appointed him the governor of Jund Qinnasrin, and in 718/19 dispatched him to lead the summer campaign against the Byzantines alongside Amr ibn Qays al-Kindi from Jund Hims.

Descendants of Abu Amr ibn Umayya (Banu Abi Mu'ayt)

Umayya
Harb	Abu al-As	Abu Amr Dhakwan	Al-As	Abu al-Is
Sufyanids	Uthmanids	Marwanids	Abu Mu'ayt Aban	Musafir
Uqba
Umara	Umm Kulthum	al-Walid	Hisham	Khalid
Aban	Abu Qatifa Amr	Hisham	Uthman	Khalid
Muhammad	al-Walid	Khalid
Yusuf
Abdallah al-Mu'ayti

Dashed line indicates skipped generation(s)
Italicized indicates other Umayyad families/lineages
Third Rashidun caliph Uthman (r. 644–656) and descendants
Ruling dynasty of Umayyad Caliphate, 661–684
Ruling dynasty of Umayyad Caliphate, 684–750

== Bibliography ==
- Crone, Patricia (1980). Slaves on Horses: The Evolution of the Islamic Polity (1980 ed.). Cambridge: Cambridge University Press. ISBN 978-0521229616.
- Hinds, Martin, ed. (1990). The History of al-Ṭabarī, Volume XXIII: The Zenith of the Marwānid House: The Last Years of ʿAbd al-Malik and the Caliphate of al-Walīd, A.D. 700–715/A.H. 81–95. SUNY Series in Near Eastern Studies. Albany, New York: State University of New York Press. ISBN 978-0-88706-721-1.
- Powers, David S., ed. (1989). The History of al-Ṭabarī, Volume XXIV: The Empire in Transition: The Caliphates of Sulaymān, ʿUmar, and Yazīd, A.D. 715–724/A.H. 96–105. SUNY Series in Near Eastern Studies. Albany, New York: State University of New York Press. ISBN 978-0-7914-0072-2.
