= Abu al-Ward =

Umayyad governor and cavalry commander (died 750)

Governor of Jund Qinnasrin
- Monarch: Marwan II

Personal details
- Died: 750 Homs
- Relations: Zufar ibn al-Harith al-Kilabi (grand father); Wathiq ibn Hudhayl (cousin); Hudhayl ibn Zufar (uncle)
- Parent: Kawthar ibn Zufar ibn al-Harith

Military service
- Allegiance: Umayyad Caliphate
- Battles/wars: Third Fitna

Majzaʾa ibn al-Kawthar ibn Zufar ibn al-Ḥārith al-Kilābī (Arabic: مَجْزَأَة بن الْكَوْثَر بن زُفَر بن الْحَارٍث الْكِلابِيّ الهَوازِنِيِّ; died 750), commonly known as Abū al-Ward (also transliterated Abūʾl-Ward), was a mid-8th century Umayyad governor of Jund Qinnasrin in Syria. He was a cavalry commander of Umayyad Caliph Marwan II and later the leader of a rebellion against the Abbasid Caliphate in Syria which aimed to reestablish the Umayyad Caliphate in 750.

== Biography ==
Abu al-Ward belonged to the Banu 'Amir ibn Sa'sa'a tribe and was a grandson of the chief, Zufar ibn al-Harith al-Kilabi, who had rebelled against the Umayyad caliph Abd al-Malik ibn Marwan (r. 685–705). During the Third Fitna, a series of civil wars and uprisings against the Umayyad Caliphate, Abu al-Ward became a strong supporter of Caliph Marwan II (r. 744–750). He was appointed the governor of the Jund Qinnasrin district (in modern northern Syria). In 745 Abu al-Ward was dispatched to the Ghouta oasis near Damascus to aid the governor of Jund Dimashq (Damascus), Zamil ibn Amr and the city's residents counter a siege by Ghouta's inhabitants, led by Yazid ibn Khalid al-Qasri.

Later in 745, Marwan dispatched Abu al-Ward with a large army to suppress a revolt in Jund Filastin (Palestine) by Thabit ibn Nu'aym, the commander of the Umayyad army in Palestine. Thabit's army reached Tiberias, the capital of Jund al-Urdunn (the Military district of Jordan), which they besieged. As Abu al-Ward departed Damascus on his way to Tiberias, word of his approach spurred the inhabitants of Tiberias, led by governor al-Walid ibn Mu'awiya ibn Marwan, a nephew of the deceased Umayyad caliph Abd al-Malik, to break Thabit's siege, oust his army from the vicinity and capture his camp. Abu al-Ward arrived later and pursued Thabit, who had withdrawn to Palestine and assembled his kinsmen and rallied his army. In the ensuing battle, Abu al-Ward defeated Thabit's forces, prompting Thabit to flee once more. Three of his sons, Nu'aym, Imran and Bakr, were wounded and captured by Abu al-Ward. They were sent to Marwan who had them treated for their wounds. Thabit was eventually captured and sent to Marwan, who had him and his sons' limbs chopped off and their bodies hung on the gate of the Umayyad Mosque.

=== Revolt against Abbasids ===
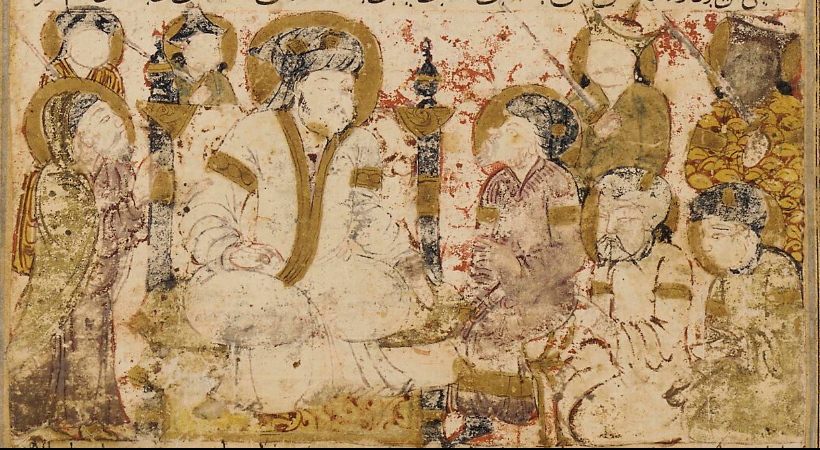
The first Abbasid caliph al-Saffah as he receives pledges of allegiance in Kufa

In early 750, following the Abbasids' rout of Marwan's army at the Battle of Zab, Abu al-Ward surrendered to the newly appointed Abbasid governor of Bilad al-Sham (Syria), Abd Allah ibn Ali. By surrendering he was able to secure a position for himself and his Qaysi confederation in the Abbasid army. Despite declaring his allegiance to the Abbasids, Abu al-Ward defected and took up the cause of the Umayyads, with whom he had ties of loyalty and kinship. Abu al-Ward made his decision after hearing that the Abbasid army's Khorasani contingent at Balis had allegedly insulted the descendants of Maslama ibn Abd al-Malik (who had close ties to Abu al-Ward's family) and assaulted their women. He assembled an army of his Qaysi loyalists and kinsmen and attacked the Khorasani officer who was headquartered in Maslama's old fort near Balis, raising the white flag of the Umayyads over the fort and instructed his loyalists at Qinnasrin near Aleppo to raise the Umayyads' flag. Abu al-Ward was soon joined by an Umayyad family member, Abu Muhammad al-Sufyani and his Yamani loyalists. Abu al-Ward assumed command over the revolt's military operations, while Abu Muhammad assumed its political leadership.

Abu al-Ward's unification of the Qaysi and Yamani tribal groups, who were traditional rivals, together with Abu Muhammad's cultivated image as a messianic Islamic figure, represented a powerful combination but the revolt was suppressed relatively quickly. After Abu al-Ward's forces defeated Abbasid troops near Qinnasrin, the Abbasid army intercepted his army in the vicinity of Homs. Abu al-Ward was killed along with 500 of his kinsmen and Qaysi soldiers. The Abbasids proceeded to defeat the rebels at Palmyra and Abu Muhammad fled Syria.

== Bibliography ==
- Cobb, Paul M. (2001). White Banners: Contention in 'Abbasid Syria, 750–880. SUNY Press. ISBN 978-0-7914-4880-9.
- Hoyland, Robert G. (2011). Theophilus of Edessa's Chronicle and the Circulation of Historical Knowledge in Late Antiquity and Early Islam. Liverpool University Press. ISBN 978-1-84631-698-2.
- Al-Tabari (1989). Williams, John Alden (ed.). The History of al-Tabari: The Waning of the Umayyad Caliphate. Vol. 26. SUNY Press. ISBN 978-1-4384-2411-8.
