= Al-Mu'ayti =

Umayyad ruler in Denia, Andalusia (1014–1016)

al-Mu'ayti
- Caliph

Ruler of Dénia and the Balearics
- Reign: 1014 – 1016
- Died: 1041
Names
- Abū ʿAbd al-Raḥmān ʿAbd Allāh ibn ʿUbayd Allāh ibn al-Walīd al-Muʿayṭī
- House: Umayyad
- Father: Ubaydallāh ibn al-Walīd
- Religion: Islam

Abū ʿAbd al-Raḥmān ʿAbd Allāh ibn ʿUbayd Allāh ibn al-Walīd al-Muʿayṭī, also spelled al-Muʿiṭī (died AD 1041 [AH 432]), was an Umayyad caliph reigning in Dénia from 1014 until 1016 in opposition to Sulayman ibn al-Musta'in, reigning from Córdoba. He was a member of the Marwanid lineage and the only Andalusian Umayyad caliph not descended from Abd al-Rahman III. He was a puppet of his hajib (chamberlain) Mujahid al-Amiri, who was the actual ruler of the kingdom of Dénia. His authority did not extended beyond Dénia and the Balearic Islands.

Al-Mu'ayti's name consists of the kunya, Abu Abd al-Rahman (meaning "father of Abd al-Rahman"); his actual given name, Abd Allah; and a series of patronymics indicating his descent from his father, Ubayd Allah. The historian Ibn Bashkuwal recorded al-Mu'ayti's genealogy back to Umayya ibn ʿAbd Shams, namesake of the dynasty. The name al-Mu'ayti itself indicates that he belonged to the branch descended from Abi Mu'ayt.

The seizure of Almería by Mujahid's rival, Khayran al-Saqlabi, in July 1014 provided the impetus for Mujahid to legitimise his rule by proclaiming a caliph of his own. Abd Allah ibn Ubayd Allah al-Mu'ayti, as a descendant of Muhammad and of the Quraysh tribe, was a legitimate claimant. He was a faqih (religious scholar), originally from Egypt, who had fled Córdoba and sought refuge in Dénia when Sulayman, with an army of Berbers, had deposed the caliph Hisham II in 1013. He was proclaimed caliph in December 1014 with the honorific title al-Muntaṣir biʾllāh (lit. 'Victor in God'). Mujahid then performed the bay'a (oath of allegiance) and was appointed hajib.

The given names of al-Mu'ayti and that of his son, Abd al-Rahman, were put on the coins and flags of Dénia. Although the da'wa (call to allegiance) of al-Mu'ayti was not widely heeded outside of the lands ruled by Mujahid, it did receive the support of the great scholar Ibn Hazm when in 1016 al-Mu'ayti was briefly the only Umayyad claimant. For this, the scholar was imprisoned by Khayran, a supporter of the non-Umayyad caliph.

Within months of al-Mu'ayti's appointment, Mujahid set out on an expedition to conquer the island of Sardinia in the name of the new caliph. During his absence, an uprising led by Ali ibn Hammud deposed and executed Sulayman. According to the historian Ibn 'Idhari, Sulayman was distracted by the elevation of al-Mu'ayti as his rival and did not foresee the uprising of Ali, who soon had himself proclaimed caliph, although he was not of Umayyad descent.

Al-Mu'ayti himself took advantage of Mujahid's absence to assert his own authority. When the hajib returned from his second failed expedition to Sardinia in 1016, he deposed al-Mu'ayti and exiled him to Africa. There he "eked out his remaining days as a wandering teacher, no doubt enthralling his pupils with tall stories of how he had once been the successor of the Prophet". He died in 1041, either at Kutama in Morocco or at Baghdad.

With al-Mu'ayti removed, Mujahid recognised Sulayman ibn al-Musta'in's successor in Córdoba, Abd al-Rahman al-Murtada, as caliph in 1017 or 1018. It has even been suggested that al-Mu'ayti's deposition was precipitated by the need for a united front against the anti-Umayyad usurpers of the Hammudid dynasty after 1016.

Descendants of Abu Amr ibn Umayya (Banu Abi Mu'ayt)

Umayya
Harb	Abu al-As	Abu Amr Dhakwan	Al-As	Abu al-Is
Sufyanids	Uthmanids	Marwanids	Abu Mu'ayt Aban	Musafir
Uqba
Umara	Umm Kulthum	al-Walid	Hisham	Khalid
Aban	Abu Qatifa Amr	Hisham	Uthman	Khalid
Muhammad	al-Walid	Khalid
Yusuf
Abdallah al-Mu'ayti

Dashed line indicates skipped generation(s)
Italicized indicates other Umayyad families/lineages
Third Rashidun caliph Uthman (r. 644–656) and descendants
Ruling dynasty of Umayyad Caliphate, 661–684
Ruling dynasty of Umayyad Caliphate, 684–750
