= Yazid ibn al-Sa'iq =

Abū Qays Yazīd ibn ʿAmr ibn Khuwaylid ibn Nufayl ibn ʿAmr ibn Kilāb, commonly known as Yazid ibn al-Sa'iq, was a chieftain, warrior, and poet of the Amr branch of the Banu Kilab, the leading clan of the Banu Amir, one of the major Arab tribes in pre-Islamic Arabia.

== Life and career ==
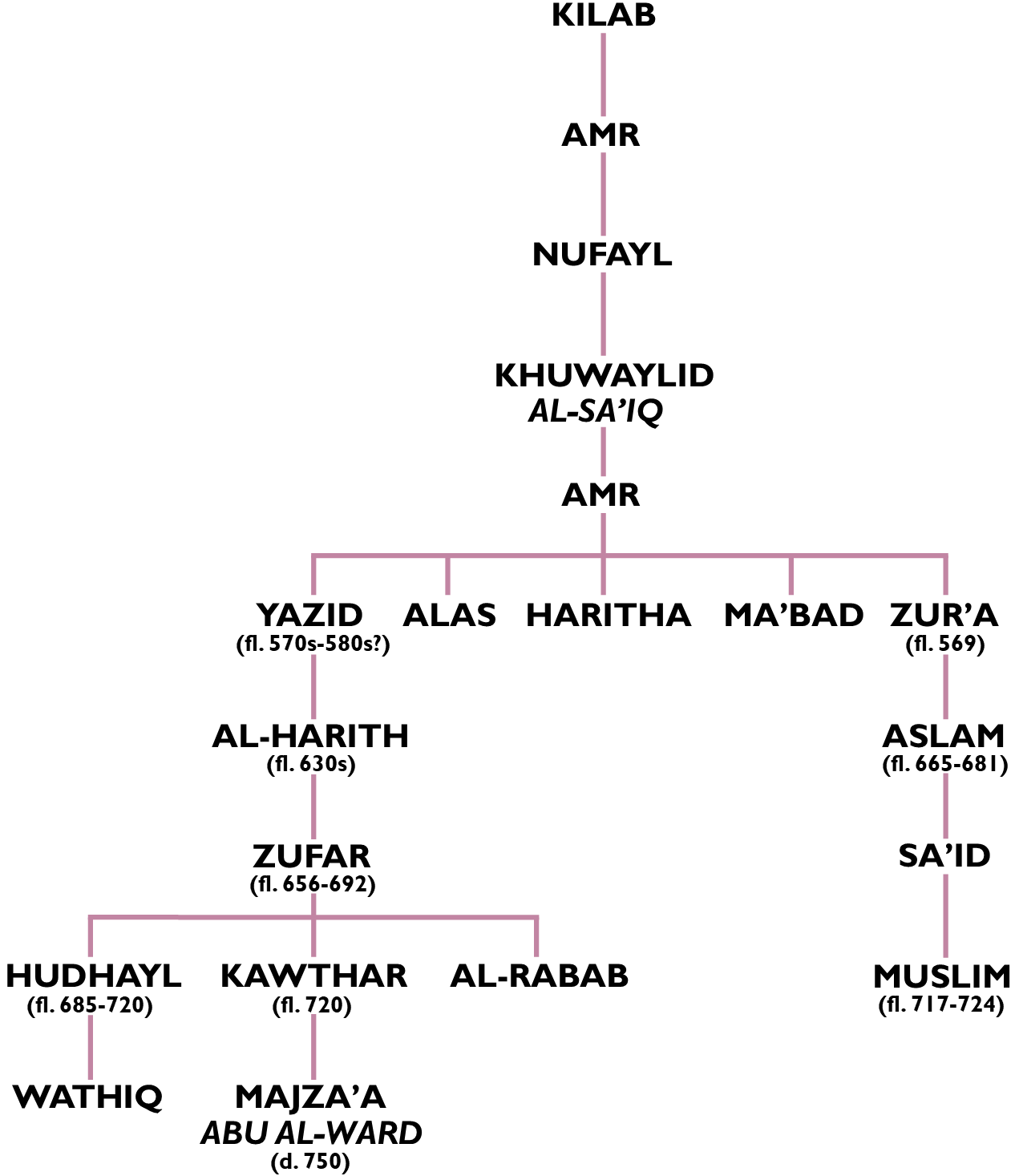
Yazid was a chieftain of the Amr branch of the Banu Kilab. His descendant Zufar ibn al-Harith al-Kilabi was preeminent chief of the Qays tribal faction in Syria during Umayyad rule.

Yazid was the son of Amr ibn Khuwaylid. His grandfather, Khuwaylid ibn Nufayl, called al-Sa'iq because he was killed by a lightning strike (al-ṣaʿiq) and Yazīd was commonly called Yazīd ibn al-Sa'iq after him. They were chiefs of the Amr branch of the Banu Kilab, the preeminent clan of the powerful Banu Amir in the pre-Islamic period.

Yazid commanded part of the Banu Amir during a raid against the tribe by the Lakhmids led by the Lakhmid king al-Nu'man's brother Wabara ibn Rumanis at the Day of al-Qurnatayn before 585. During the fighting Yazid captured Wabara. He ransomed Wabara in exchange for half of Wabara's properties, 1,000 camels, and two singing girls. When he met with al-Nu'man in al-Hirah to collect the ransom and release Wabara, the king was said to have questioned how a man of Yazid's short stature could capture a stocky man such as Wabara. Yazid is said to have responded that it was because his own tribesmen had attended the battle while Wabara had depended on mercenaries rather than his maternal tribesmen from the Banu Kalb. Yazid recited a verse in one of his poems that "They [the Amir] left the brother of al-Nu'man walking in [shackles as a captive] and mutilated the troops of the king".

== Death ==
During a raid by the Banu Amir against the Banu Tamim at a place called Dhu Najab near Wadi al-Rummah, Yazid was struck in the head by an opposing tribesman and died of his wound. For this a Tamimi poet Aws ibn Ghalfa satirized Yazid. He was also satirized by al-Nabigha, a prominent pre-Islamic poet.

A son of Yazid ibn al-Sa'iq, Mu'adh, opposed the defection of his tribesmen from the early Muslim state during the Ridda wars. Among Yazid's other descendants were Zufar ibn al-Harith al-Kilabi, a leader of the Banu Amir and the larger Qays confederation in Syria in the late 7th century. Another descendant, his grandson Yazid ibn Qays ibn Yazid, was cited by the historian Ibn Hajar al-Asqalani as a transmitter of information about Yazid's war against the Lakhmids.

== Bibliography ==
- Caskel, Werner (1966). Ğamharat an-nasab: Das genealogische Werk des His̆ām ibn Muḥammad al-Kalbī, Volume II (in German). Leiden: Brill.
- Kister, M. J. (2017) [1999]. "Al-Ḥīra: Some Notes on its Relations with Arabia". In Peters, F. E. (ed.). The Arabs and Arabia on the Eve of Islam. Abingdon, Oxon: Routledge. pp. 109–128. ISBN 978-0-86078-702-0.
- Lyall, Charles (1918). The Mufaḍḍalīyāt: An Anthology of Ancient Arabian Odes, Volume 2. Oxford: Clarendon Press.
- Sezgin, Fuat (1975). Geschichte des arabischen schriftums, Band II, Poesie bis ca. 430H (in German). Leiden: Brill.
