= Battle of Marash (694) =

- Part of the Arab–Byzantine wars
- Map of the Arab-Byzantine frontier zone
Date	August/September 694 CE
Location	Marash, Turkey
Result	Umayyad victory

Belligerents
Umayyad Caliphate	Byzantine Empire

Commanders and leaders
Aban ibn al-Walid ibn Uqba; Dinar ibn Dinar	Unknown

Casualties and losses
Unknown	40,000 (exaggerated)

The Battle of Marash was a military engagement between the Byzantines and the Umayyads in the environs of Marash. The Byzantines attempted a raid into Syria but were defeated by the Umayyads.

== Background ==
After the Byzantine defeat at the Battle of Sebastopolis in 692, the situation in Armenia became difficult. The Armenian prince, Smbat VI Bagratuni, asked the Umayyads for help against the Byzantines. In 693, the Umayyads appointed Muhammad ibn Marwan as the governor of Armenia, and the Byzantines were forced to evacuate the province. Warfare between the Arabs and the Byzantines continued.

== Battle ==
The Syrians and the Arab sources in particular maintain that the Byzantines were the first to attack. In August/September of 694, the Byzantine army launched an attack into Syria deep from Marash. News of this attack reached the Umayyad governor of Qinnasrin, Aban ibn al-Walid ibn Uqba, and Dinar bin Dinar, the Mawla of the Caliph Abd al-Malik ibn Marwan. They quickly marched to intercept the Byzantines. Both sides met at the environs of Marash. A battle ensued, which ended in Byzantine defeat, and they forcibly retreated from the area. The Umayyads chased them, killing and capturing many of them. Arab sources claim the Byzantines lost 40,000 during the battle, but that's clearly an exaggeration.

The Byzantine defeat at Marash was serious, which forced them to abandon the city. According to Al-Baladhuri, Muhammad ibn Marwan went to Marash and fortified it and obliged the people of Qinnasrin to send troops there every year.

== Sources ==
- Andreas N. Stratos (1980) Byzantium in the seventh century, Vol. V, Justinian II, Leontius and Tiberius, 685–711.
- John Bagnell Bury (1911), The Cambridge Medieval History: The rise of the Saracens and the foundation of the Western empire.
- Hugh Kennedy (2022), History of the Arab Invasions: The Conquest of the Lands, A New Translation of Al-Baladhuri's Futuh Al-Buldan.
- George Frederick Young (1916), East and West Through Fifteen Centuries, Being a General History from B.C. 44 to A.D. 1453, Vol II.
