= Jund Qinnasrin =

One of five sub-provinces of Syria under the Umayyad and Abbasid Caliphates

Coordinates: 35.92°N 37.20°E

Syria (Bilad al-Sham) and its provinces under the Abbasid Caliphate in the 9th century

Jund Qinnasrīn (Arabic: جُـنْـد قِـنَّـسْـرِيْـن, "military district of Qinnasrin") was one of five sub-provinces of Syria under the Umayyad and Abbasid Caliphates, organized soon after the Muslim conquest of Syria in the 7th century CE. Initially, its capital was Qinnasrin, but as the city declined in population and wealth, the capital was moved to Aleppo. By 985, the district's principal towns were Manbij, Alexandretta, Hama, Shaizar, Ma'arrat al-Nu'man, Samosata, Jusiya, Wadi Butnan, Rafaniyya, Lajjun, Mar'ash, Qinnasrin, al-Tinat (possibly ancient Issus), Balis, and Suwaydiyya.

== History ==
Originally a part of Jund Hims, the first Umayyad caliph Mu'awiya I established the Jund Qinnasrin when he defeated Hasan ibn Ali, and subsequently detached the people of that area from their allegiance to him. 9th century Muslim historian al-Biladhuri says, however, that it was Muawiya's successor Yazid I who founded the district after separating northern territories from Jund Hims. The newly established district was named after the ancient town of Qinnasrin which was located within its boundaries. Under the Umayyads, Jund Qinnasrin composed of three districts: Antioch, Aleppo, and Manbij.

After caliph al-Mansur's conquests of southern Anatolia, Syria's northern frontiers were considerably extended and in 786, during the reign of the Harun al-Rashid, the now-overgrown Jund Qinnasrin was subdivided. The area toward the northern frontier, comprising the territories of Antioch and the lands east towards Aleppo were split from the district to form Jund al-'Awasim. For the remainder of the Abbasid period, Jund Qinnasrin consisted of the cities of Aleppo (the capital of the district), Qinnasrin and the lands around them, as well as the Sarmin territory.

== Governors ==
=== Umayyad period ===
- Sa'id ibn Malik ibn Bahdal (680–683)
- Zufar ibn al-Harith al-Kilabi (684; expelled Sa'id ibn Malik and gave allegiance to the anti-Umayyad caliph Ibn al-Zubayr)
- Aban ibn al-Walid ibn Uqba (684–685)
- Maslama ibn Abd al-Malik and Qurra ibn Sharik al-Absi (both governed at different periods in 685–705, Qurra's term may have continued until 709)
- Marthad ibn Sharik al-Absi (709–?)
- Al-Walid ibn Hisham ibn al-Walid ibn Uqba and Hilal ibn Abd al-A'la (both ruled at different points in 717–720)
- Bishr ibn al-Walid (720–724)
- Al-Walid ibn Qa'qa ibn Khulayd al-Absi (737–743)
- Yazid ibn Umar ibn Hubayra al-Fazari (743–744)
- Abd al-Malik ibn Kawthar al-Ghanawi (undetermined period in 744–750)
- Majza'a ibn Kawthar ibn Zufar al-Kilabi (undetermined period in 744–750, last Umayyad governor of Qinnasrin)

== See also ==
- Aban ibn al-Walid ibn Uqba
- the region of Syria
- Levant
- Mashriq
- Middle East
- Shaam

== Bibliography ==
- Caskel, Werner (1966). Ğamharat an-nasab: Das genealogische Werk des His̆ām ibn Muḥammad al-Kalbī, Volume II (in German). Leiden: Brill.
- Cobb, Paul M. (2001). White Banners: Contention in 'Abbasid Syria, 750–880. SUNY Press. ISBN 978-0-7914-4880-9.
- Crone, Patricia (1980). Slaves on Horses: The Evolution of the Islamic Polity. Cambridge: Cambridge University Press. ISBN 0-521-52940-9.
- Hillenbrand, Carole, ed. (1989). The History of al-Ṭabarī, Volume XXVI: The Waning of the Umayyad Caliphate: Prelude to Revolution, A.D. 738–744/A.H. 121–126. SUNY Series in Near Eastern Studies. Albany, New York: State University of New York Press. ISBN 978-0-88706-810-2.
- Işıltan, Fikret (1960). Urfa bölgesi tarihi: başlangıçtan h. 210-m. 825 e kadar. Urfa: Edebiyat Fakültesi Basimevi.
