= List of people related to Quranic verses =

This page is a List of people related to Quranic verses:

== Ahl al-Bayt ==
The Ahl al-Bayt was Muhammad's household. Shi'a and Sunni have differing views regarding who is included among them, and also different views regarding which verses are associated with the household. Sunni consider Muhammad's wives, Children of Muhammad and uncles of Muhammad and their children the Ahl al-Bayt.

=== Generally ===
==== 3:61 ====
And whoso disputeth with thee concerning him, after the knowledge which hath come unto thee, say (unto him): Come! We will summon our sons and your sons, and our women and your women, and ourselves and yourselves, then we will pray humbly (to our Lord) and (solemnly) invoke the curse of Allah upon those who lie.

— Surah Al Imran 3:61

According to hadith collections, in 631 an Arab Christian envoy from Najran (currently in northern Yemen and partly in Saudi Arabia) came to Muhammad to argue which of the two parties erred in its doctrine concerning Jesus. After likening Jesus' miraculous birth to Adam's creation, Muhammad called them to mubahala (cursing), where each party should ask God to destroy the lying party and their families. Muhammad, to prove to them that he is a prophet, brought his daughter Fatimah and his surviving grandchildren, Hasan ibn Ali and Husayn ibn Ali, and Ali ibn Abi Talib and came back to the Christians and said this is my family and covered himself and his family with a cloak. Allameh Tabatabaei explains in Tafsir al-Mizan that the word "Our selves" in this verse refers to Muhammad and Ali. Then he narrates Imam Ali al-Rida, eighth Shia Imam, in discussion with Al-Ma'mun, Abbasid caliph, referred to this verse to prove the superiority of Muhammad's progeny over the rest of the Muslim community, and considered it as the proof for Ali's right for caliphate due to Allah made Ali like the self of Muhammad.

=== Ali ibn Abi Talib ===
Before Shia & Sunni Ali is the one of Ahl al-Bayt. Ali is the fourth Sunni Caliph and first Shia Imam.

==== 2.207 ====
And among men is he who sells his nafs (self) in exchange for the pleasure of Allah

— Surah Al-Baqara 2:207

In 622, the year of Muhammad's migration to Yathrib (now Medina), Ali risked his life by sleeping in Muhammad's bed to impersonate him and thwart an assassination plot, so that Muhammad could escape in safety. This night is called Laylat al-mabit. According to some hadith, a verse was revealed about Ali concerning his sacrifice on the night of Hijra which says, "

==== 5.3 ====
Today I have perfected your religion, and completed my favours for you and chosen Islam as a religion for you.

— Surah Al-Ma'idah 5:3

According to Sunni Tafsir this verse was delivered in Farewell Pilgrimage while according to Shia ones it refers to appointment of Ali ibn Abi Talib as the successor of Muhammad in pond of Khumm which happened while Muslims returned from Mecca to Medina, few days later.

==== 5.55 ====
Only Allah is your Wali (guardian) and His Apostle and those who believe, maintain the prayer and give the zakāt while bowing.

— Surah Al-Ma'idah 5:55

It is unanimous among only Shia that this verse refers to Ali ibn Abi Talib and was revealed after he had given his ring away to someone in need who had entered the mosque while prayer was in progress.

==== 13.7 ====
And the Unbelievers say: "Why is not a sign sent down to him from his Lord?" But thou art truly a warner, and to every people a guide.

— Surah Ar-Ra'd 13:7

Some Shia sources claim that when this verse was revealed when Mohammad said "I'm the warner and the guide and through you will be guided those who are to be guided."

== Muhammad's wives ==
=== Khadija ===
Khadija was Muhammad's first wife. She was a businesswoman and Muhammad was her employee. Muhammad did not marry a second wife until after she died, an event which Muhammad greatly mourned. Muhammad was 50 years old when Khadija died.

=== Hafsa ===
These Ayahs are talking to Hafsa and Aisha, two of Muhammad's wives who disclose secret of Muhammad .

Surah at-Tahrim, Ayahs 3-5:

3"And when the Prophet (blessings and peace be upon him) secretly disclosed a matter to one of his wives, but when she mentioned it and Allah made it known to the Prophet (blessings and peace be upon him), then the Prophet reminded her of some part of it and overlooked (to inform) the rest of it. Then when the Prophet (blessings and peace be upon him) informed her of it (that she had disclosed that secret), she said: ‘Who has told you of that?’ The Prophet (blessings and peace be upon him) said: ‘The All-Knowing, All-Aware (Lord) has told me.’

. 4. If you both turn to Allah in repentance, (that is better for you) because the hearts of both of you have inclined (towards the same), but if you help one another in this matter (that may annoy the Holy Prophet [blessings and peace be upon him]). So surely Allah is the One Who is his Friend and Helper and Jibril (Gabriel) and the most pious believers and after them (all) angels too are (his) helpers.

If he divorces you, then it may well be that your Lord will give him in your place better wives than yourselves (who) will be obedient, true believers, submissive, penitent, worshippers, given to fasting, (some) formerly married and (some) virgins."

=== Zaynab bint Jahsh ===
Zaynab was married to Zayd ibn Harithah until they divorced and she married Muhammad.

==== 33:36 ====
is not fitting for a Believer, man or woman, when a matter has been decided by Allah and His Messenger to have any option about their decision: if any one disobeys Allah and His Messenger, he is indeed on a clearly wrong Path.

=== Sawda bint Zama ===
==== Quran 4:127 ====
And they ask you a decision about women. Say: God makes known to you His decision concerning them, and that which is recited to you in the Book concerning female orphans whom you do not give what is appointed for them while you desire to marry them, and concerning the weak among children, and that you should deal towards orphans with equity; and whatever good you do, God surely knows it.

== Clans ==
=== Banu Abd-al-Manaf ===
A sub-clan of the Quraish tribe.

==== Generally ====
===== 102.1-2 =====
"Engage (your) vying in exuberance, until ye come to the graves."

==== A'as ibn Wa'il ====
A'as ibn Wa'il is the father of Amr ibn al-A'as.

===== 108 =====
Entire chapter

=== Banu Sahm ===
A sub-clan of the Quraish tribe.

==== Generally ====
===== 102.1-2 =====
"Engage (your) vying in exuberance, until ye come to the graves."

=== Banu Makhzum ===
A sub-clan of the Quraish tribe.

==== Walid ibn al-Mughira ====
===== Quran 68:10-13 =====
"Heed not the type of despicable men,- ready with oaths, A slanderer, going about with calumnies, (Habitually) hindering (all) good, transgressing beyond bounds, deep in sin, Violent (and cruel), with all that, base-born."

Quran 74:11-26

"Leave Me with the one I created alone. And to whom I granted extensive wealth. And children present [with him]. And spread [everything] before him, easing [his life]. Then he desires that I should add more. No! Indeed, he has been toward Our verses obstinate. I will cover him with arduous torment. Indeed, he thought and deliberated. So may he be destroyed [for] how he deliberated. Then may he be destroyed [for] how he deliberated. Then he considered [again]; Then he frowned and scowled;Then he turned back and was arrogant. And said, "This [Quran] is not but magic imitated [from others]. This is not but the word of a human being." I will drive him into Saqar"

=== Banu Zuhrah ===
A sub-clan of the Quraish tribe.

==== Sa'd ibn Abi-Waqqas ====
===== Quran 31:14-15 =====
"And We have enjoined man in respect of his parents-- his mother bears him with faintings upon faintings and his weaning takes two years-- saying: Be grateful to Me and to both your parents; to Me is the eventual coming. And if they contend with you that you should associate with Me what you have no knowledge of, do not obey them, and keep company with them in this world kindly, and follow the way of him who turns to Me, then to Me is your return, then will I inform you of what you did--"

=== Banu Hashim ===
The Banu Hashim was Muhammad's own clan.

==== Generally ====
===== 26.214 =====
"come out openly and warn the people of your own clan."

==== Abu Lahab ====
Abu Lahab was an enemy of Muhammad, and the brother of Muhammad's father. His name means "father of fire" and is one of the three Meccan personal names mentioned in the Quran. (Other two names are Muhammad himself and his friend Zaid)

===== 111.1-5 =====
1. Perish the two hands of Abû Lahab, and perish he!
2. His wealth and his children (etc.) will not benefit him!
3. He will be burnt in a Fire of blazing flames!
4. And his wife too, who carries wood (thorns of Sadan which she used to put on the way of the Prophet or use to slander him).
5. In her neck is a rope of Masad (fire).

=== Unclassified clan ===
==== Akhnas ibn Shariq ====
===== Quran 2:104 =====
Entire chapter.

===== Quran 2:204-205 =====
An incident occurred prior to these verses being revealed. A man named Al-Akhnas ibn Shuriq came to Muhammad to embrace Islam, but as he turned to leave, he happened to pass by a pasture and grazing animals. He set it alight and killed the cattle. This verses express disapproval.

==== Uqbah ibn Abu Mu'ayt ====
===== Quran 25:27 =====
One sources claims this verse is regarding Uqbah ibn Mu'ayt and Ubay ibn Khalaf.

==== Ubay ibn Khalaf ====
===== Quran 25:27 =====
One sources claims this verse is regarding Uqbah ibn Mu'ayt and Ubay ibn Khalaf.

===== Quran 8:17 =====
One sources stats he was ransomed from after Badr, but was killed by Muhammad himself with a spear in the Battle of Uhud (625 CE). Verse 8:17 was revealed in this occasion.

== Sahaba ==
Prophet Muhammad's companions.

=== Zayd ibn Harithah ===
Zayd was Muhammad's adopted son. He is the only companion of Muhammad whose name appears in the Quran.

==== Quran 33:37 ====
And ˹remember, O Prophet,˺ when you said to the one1 for whom Allah has done a favour and you ˹too˺ have done a favour,2 “Keep your wife and fear Allah,” while concealing within yourself what Allah was going to reveal. And ˹so˺ you were considering the people, whereas Allah was more worthy of your consideration. So when Zaid totally lost interest in ˹keeping˺ his wife, We gave her to you in marriage, so that there would be no blame on the believers for marrying the ex-wives of their adopted sons after their divorce. And Allah’s command is totally binding.

=== Salman the Persian ===
Salman was a companion of Muhammad, highly respected by both Shi'a and Sunni

==== Quran 62:3 ====
And He (Allah) has sent him (Muhammad) also to other (Muslims).

=== Ibn Umm Maktum ===
Ibn Umm Maktum was a companion of Muhammad, the blind man who approached him.

=== Quran 80:02 ===
'Simply because the blind man came to him interrupting.'

== Notes ==
=== Works cited ===
- Tabatabaei, Sayyid Mohammad Hosayn (1979). Shiʻite Islam. Translated by Seyyed Hossein Nasr. State University of New York Press. ISBN 978-0-87395-272-9.
