= Umm Kulthum bint Uqba =

Companion (Sahabiyyah) of Muhammad (c.610–654)

Umm Kulthum bint Uqba أُمُّ كُلثُوم بِنْتِ عُقبَة
- Born: c. 610; Mecca, Hejaz, Arabia
- Died: c. 654 (aged 43–44); Hejaz, Rashidun Caliphate
- Known for: Companion of Muhammad
- Spouses: Zayd ibn Haritha; Zubayr ibn al-Awwam; Abd al-Rahman ibn Awf; Amr ibn al-'As
- Parents: Uqba ibn Abi Mu'ayt (father); Arwa bint Kurayz (mother)
- Relatives: Uthman (half-brother); al-Walid (full-brother)
- Family: Banu Umayya (clan)

Umm Kulthūm bint ʿUqba (Arabic: أُمُّ كُلثُوم بِنْتِ عُقبَة) (c. 610–654) was a follower or companion (Sahabiyyah) of the Islamic prophet Muhammad. A verse of the Qur'an, 60:10, was revealed in response to her situation.

== Emigration ==
Born in Mecca, she was the daughter of Uqba ibn Abu Mu'ayt and Arwa bint Kurayz; hence Caliph Uthman was her uterine half-brother. Their mother Arwa was a first cousin of Muhammad.

Umm Kulthum's father Uqba was an outspoken opponent of Muhammad, but she became a Muslim before 622. She remained in Mecca after the Hijra. Uqba was killed at the Battle of Badr in 624.

After the Treaty of Hudaybiyyah in 628, Umm Kulthum left Mecca for Medina in the company of a man from the Khuza'a tribe. Her brothers, Walid and Ammara, pursued her, and she arrived in Medina only one day ahead of them. Her brothers asked Muhammad to return her to them, in accordance with the treaty, which stated that Muslims who escaped from Mecca to Medina should be returned to their families. Umm Kulthum pleaded that "women are weak" and that she might not have the strength to remain firm in her faith if she had to live among polytheists. Muhammad then announced the new revelation:

O you who believe! When believing women come to you as emigrants, examine them; Allah knows best as to their faith, then if you ascertain that they are true believers, send them not back to the disbelievers. They are not lawful for the disbelievers nor are the disbelievers lawful for them. But give them (disbelievers) that which they have spent (on their dower).

— Qur'an 60:10.

After this prophecy, he pointed out that the word in the treaty for "escaped people" was masculine, so it did not apply to women. However, escaped women must be tested for the genuineness of their faith. Umm Kulthum was asked whether she had come to Medina "for love of Allah and his Apostle and Islam" or whether she was seeking or escaping a husband or hoping to make money. After she had passed the test, Muhammad told her brothers: "Allah has broken the treaty regarding women by what you know, so leave."

Other women then followed Umm Kulthum's example and also left Mecca for Medina.

== Marriage ==
Four men asked for her hand in marriage, and in fact she was to marry all four of them in rotation. She asked her brother Uthman which suitor she should accept, and he advised her to consult Muhammed. He instructed her to marry Zayd ibn Harithah. The couple had two children, of whom Zayd died in infancy, but Ruqayya lived to come under the protection of Uthman. Zayd divorced Umm Kulthum, but was killed soon afterwards at the battle of Mu'tah.

She then married Zubayr ibn al-Awwam, whom she "disliked" because he had "some harshness towards women." She asked him for a divorce, but he refused. So "she pestered him while he was doing wudu for the prayer, and he divorced her with a single divorce." She then left the room and gave birth to their daughter Zaynab, which immediately ended her 'iddah. When Zubayr heard, he complained, "She tricked me, may Allah trick her!" Muhammad advised him to "propose to her again," but Zubayr replied: "She will never come back to me."

Her third husband was Abd al-Rahman ibn Awf. They had six children: Muhammad, Ibrahim, Hamid (or Humayd), Ismail, Hamida and Amat ar-Rahman. This marriage lasted over twenty years, until Abd al-Rahman's death in 653/654.

On being widowed, Umm Kulthum married Amr ibn al-'As, but she died only one month later.

Descendants of Abu Amr ibn Umayya (Banu Abi Mu'ayt)

Umayya
Harb	Abu al-As	Abu Amr Dhakwan	Al-As	Abu al-Is
Sufyanids	Uthmanids	Marwanids	Abu Mu'ayt Aban	Musafir
Uqba
Umara	Umm Kulthum	al-Walid	Hisham	Khalid
Aban	Abu Qatifa Amr	Hisham	Uthman	Khalid
Muhammad	al-Walid	Khalid
Yusuf
Abdallah al-Mu'ayti

Dashed line indicates skipped generation(s)
Italicized indicates other Umayyad families/lineages
Third Rashidun caliph Uthman (r. 644–656) and descendants
Ruling dynasty of Umayyad Caliphate, 661–684
Ruling dynasty of Umayyad Caliphate, 684–750
