= Uqba ibn Abi Mu'ayt =

Leading adversary of Islam (died 624)

Uqba ibn Abi Mu'ayt (Arabic: عقبة بن أبي معيط, romanized: ʿUqbah ibn ʾAbī Muʿayṭ; d. 624) was one of the principal adversaries of Islam. He was a Quraysh leader and a member of the Banu 'Abdu Shams clan of Quraish tribe.

== Family ==
=== Family lineage ===
He was 'Uqba, son of Abu Mu'ayt, son of Abu 'Amr, son of Umayyah ibn Abd Shams, son of Abd Shams, son of Abd Manaf, son of Qusayy, son of Kilab, son of Murrah, son of Ka'b, son of Lu'ayy, son of Ghalib, son of Fihr, son of Malik, son of Al-Nadr, son of Kinanah, son of Khuzaymah, son of Mudrikah, son of Ilyas, son of Mudar, son of Nizar, son of Ma'ad ibn Adnan, son of Adnan.

‘Uqbah was the son of Abu Mu‘ayṭ ibn Abu ‘Amr ibn Umayyah ibn ‘Abd Shams and of Shayma bint Abd-al-Uzza from the Banu Amir. Abu Mu'ayt's mother was Kabsha bint Abd al-Manat from Banu Amir. Uqbah's aunt, Safiyya bint Abi ‘Amr, married Abu Sufyan.

=== Family marriage ===
He married Arwa bint Kurayz, a member of the Banu Abd-Shams and the widow of ‘Affān ibn Abu al-‘Āṣ, making Uqba the stepfather of the future Caliph Uthman and Amina. Uqba and Arwa had six children: Walid, Umara, Khalid, Umm Kulthum, Umm Hakim and Hind.

== Role of 'Uqbah in opposing Muhammad ==
Uqbah was one of the neighbors of Muhammad. Yet he assaulted Muhammad verbally and physically as he was preaching Islam. He also constantly ridiculed Muhammad when the latter was preaching in Mecca. On one occasion, when Muhammad was praying in the courtyard of the Ka'ba, Uqba brought the waste of a slaughtered camel (intestines, blood, dung, etc.) upon the suggestion of other Quraysh leaders who were gathered there, and placed it upon Muhammad's back while he was in prostration. They laughed so much that they fell on each other. He remained in that position due to the weight, unable to lift his head from prostration until his daughter came and removed it.

On another occasion, Uqba spat on Muhammad's face at the incitement of his friend Ubay ibn Khalaf and so, a Quranic verse ^{[Quran 25:29]} was revealed at that moment to Muhammad regarding Uqba and Ubay. Uqbah was also one of those enemies of Muhammad who rejoiced at the news of the death of Muhammad's second son 'Abdullah.

Ubayy ibn Khalaf ibn Safwan was a close friend of ‘Uqbah. When Ubayy learned that ‘Uqba had sat and listened to the apostle, he told ‘Uqbah, ‘Do I hear that you have sat with Muhammad and listened to him? I swear I will never see you or speak to you again if you do the same again, or if you do not go and spit in his face.’ ‘Uqba indeed did this so that Allah sent down concerning the pair of them: “On the day that the sinner bites his hands, saying, would that I had chosen a path with the apostle.” (Sura 25: 27)

== Death ==
According to numerous authentic and trustworthy sources such as a number of narrations in Sahih Bukhari, and Ibn Sa'd's biographical compendium, the Tabaqat Al-Kubra, Uqba was killed in the field during the Battle of Badr and was among those Quraysh leaders whose corpses were buried in a pit. According to Muslim scholar Safiur Rahman al-Mubarakpuri, after the Battle of Badr two captives – Nadr bin Harith and ‘Uqbah ibn Abū Mu‘ayṭ were beheaded by Ali. Mubarakpuri mentions that this incident about the beheading is also mentioned in the Sunan Abu Dawud no 2686 and Anwal Ma'bud 3/12.

Descendants of Abu Amr ibn Umayya (Banu Abi Mu'ayt)

Umayya
Harb	Abu al-As	Abu Amr Dhakwan	Al-As	Abu al-Is
Sufyanids	Uthmanids	Marwanids	Abu Mu'ayt Aban	Musafir
Uqba
Umara	Umm Kulthum	al-Walid	Hisham	Khalid
Aban	Abu Qatifa Amr	Hisham	Uthman	Khalid
Muhammad	al-Walid	Khalid
Yusuf
Abdallah al-Mu'ayti

Dashed line indicates skipped generation(s)
Italicized indicates other Umayyad families/lineages
Third Rashidun caliph Uthman (r. 644–656) and descendants
Ruling dynasty of Umayyad Caliphate, 661–684
Ruling dynasty of Umayyad Caliphate, 684–750

== See also ==
- Non-Muslims who interacted with Muslims during Muhammad's era
- Persons related to Qur'anic verses
