= Zufar ibn al-Harith al-Kilabi =

7th-century Muslim military commander and tribal chief

Zufar ibn al-Harith al-Kilabi زفر بن الحارث الكلابي

Governor of Jund Qinnasrin
- In office 684
- Preceded by: Sa'id ibn Malik ibn Bahdal
- Succeeded by: Aban ibn al-Walid ibn Uqba

Personal details
- Died: c. 694–695
- Relations: Aws (brother); Maslama ibn Abd al-Malik (son-in-law); Abu al-Ward (grandson)
- Children: Hudhayl (son); Kawthar (son); Waki' (son); Rabab (daughter)
- Parent: Al-Harith ibn Yazid al-Amiri (father)

Military service
- Allegiance: Uthmaniyya (led by Aisha, 656); Umayyad Caliphate (657–684); Zubayrid Caliphate (684–691); Umayyad Caliphate (691–death)
- Years of service: c. 656–694/95
- Battles/wars: First Fitna; Battle of the Camel; Battle of Siffin; Second Fitna; Battle of al-Harra; Battle of Marj Rahit; Qays–Yaman war

Abu al-Hudhayl Zufar ibn al-Harith al-Kilabi (Note: Arabic: أبو الهذيل زفر بن الحارث الكلابي, romanized: Abū al-Hudhayl Zufar ibn al-Ḥārith al-Kilābī) (died c. 694–695) was a Muslim commander, a chieftain of the Arabian tribe of Banu Amir, and the preeminent leader of the Qays tribal–political faction in the late 7th century. During the First Muslim Civil War he commanded his tribe in A'isha's army against Caliph Ali's forces at the Battle of the Camel near Basra in 656. The following year, he relocated from Iraq to the Jazira (Upper Mesopotamia) and fought under Mu'awiya ibn Abi Sufyan, future founder of the Umayyad Caliphate, against Ali at the Battle of Siffin. During the Second Muslim Civil War he served Mu'awiya's son, Caliph Yazid I (r. 680–683), leading the troops of Jund Qinnasrin (the military district of northern Syria) against anti-Umayyad rebels in the 683 Battle of al-Harra.

After Yazid died during the civil war, Zufar supported Abd Allah ibn al-Zubayr's bid to wrest the caliphate from the Umayyads, expelling the Umayyad governor of Qinnasrin, and dispatching Qaysi troops to back the pro-Zubayrid governor of Damascus, al-Dahhak ibn Qays al-Fihri. At the 684 Battle of Marj Rahit, the Qays were crushed by the Umayyads and their tribal allies from the Banu Kalb, rivals of the Qays, and al-Dahhak was slain. Afterward, Zufar set up headquarters in the Jaziran town of Qarqisiya (Circesium) and led the Qays against the Kalb, launching several raids against the latter in the Syrian Desert. By 688–689, he became embroiled in a conflict with the Taghlib tribe in support of his Qaysi ally Umayr ibn al-Hubab of the Banu Sulaym, despite previous efforts to mend their feud. After resisting three sieges of Qarqisiya from 685 to 691, Zufar negotiated a peace with the Umayyad caliph Abd al-Malik (r. 685–705). Zufar abandoned Ibn al-Zubayr's cause in return for privileges in the Umayyad court and army, as well as pardons and cash for his Qaysi partisans, who were integrated into the Umayyad military. The peace was sealed by the marriage of Zufar's daughter Rabab to the caliph's son Maslama.

Under Abd al-Malik's successors, Zufar's descendants inherited his high position and prestige in the Umayyad court, as well as his preeminence among the Qays. In 750, his grandson, Abu al-Ward, led an abortive Qaysi revolt against the Umayyads' successors, the Abbasids, in which he and several members of the family were slain.

== Early career ==
Zufar belonged to the Amr branch of the Banu Kilab, which itself was a major branch of the large Arab tribe of Banu Amir, whose traditional abode was in the southwestern Najd (central Arabia). The Amr branch was known to be one of the more militant and warlike divisions of the Banu Kilab. A late 6th-century, pre-Islamic chief of the Banu Amir from the Amr division, Yazid ibn al-Sa'iq, was a paternal ancestor of Zufar. Zufar's father, al-Harith ibn Yazid al-Amiri, served as the commander of the Muslim army's vanguard during the Muslim conquest of the towns of Hit and Qarqisiya (Circesium), both located along the Euphrates River, in 637 or 638. The family, including other members of the Amr, such as the tribal chief Aslam ibn Zur'a ibn al-Sa'iq, settled in the garrison town of Basra in Iraq, which was established for the Arab tribal soldiers of the Muslim army in 638.

During the First Muslim Civil War (656–661), Zufar fought alongside the forces of A'isha, the third wife of the Islamic prophet Muhammad, against Muhammad's cousin and son-in-law, Caliph Ali (r. 656–661), at the Battle of the Camel, outside Basra, in November 656. In that battle, Zufar commanded the men of the Banu Amir. Accounts in the history of al-Tabari (d. 923) note that during the fighting, he was the last of a series of A'isha's partisans to hold and guide the nose rein of the camel she was seated upon, defending her against opposing soldiers. All the participating elders of the Banu Amir were slain in the battle, with the apparent sole exception of Zufar. Ali defeated A'isha, who retired to Medina. Zufar moved to the Jazira (Upper Mesopotamia).

When Ali and his Iraqi army entered the Jazira in 657, Zufar was given a senior command role in the right flank of the Syrian army by the governor of Syria, Mu'awiya ibn Abi Sufyan, in the Battle of Siffin. The battle ended in arbitration. Ali was assassinated by a Kharijite (a faction opposed to both Ali and Mu'awiya) in 661 and Mu'awiya became caliph in the same year, founding the Umayyad dynasty. During the reign of Mu'awiya's son and successor, Yazid I (r. 680–683), Zufar served as a commander in Muslim ibn Uqba's army in its 683 campaign to quash a rebellion in the Hejaz (western Arabia); the rebellion was in support of Abd Allah ibn al-Zubayr's bid for the caliphate. According to the historian al-Ya'qubi (d. 897), during the campaign, Zufar led a contingent composed of the men of Jund Qinnasrin (the military district of northern Syria) at the Battle of al-Harra outside of Medina.

== Leader of the Qays in Syria ==
=== Rebellion against the Umayyads ===
Map of the political situation in the Caliphate about 686, during the Second Muslim Civil War

The deaths of Yazid and his successor, Mu'awiya II, in 683 and 684, amid the revolt of Ibn al-Zubayr, left the Umayyad Caliphate in political disarray. Yazid's and Mu'awiya II's governor in Qinnasrin was their maternal cousin, Sa'id ibn Malik ibn Bahdal of the Banu Kalb tribe. The Kalb held a privileged position in Syria, the Umayyad Caliphate's center of power, to the chagrin of the Qays. The Qays of Qinnasrin, the predominant tribe in this district, resented being under the authority of a Kalbi, and, under Zufar's leadership, expelled Sa'id. Zufar revolted against the Umayyads and gave his allegiance to Ibn al-Zubayr. While the Qaysi chieftains leaned towards Ibn al-Zubayr, the leaders of the Kalb and their allies scrambled to maintain Umayyad rule, and nominated a distant Umayyad cousin of Mu'awiya I, Marwan I, to assume the caliphate.

The Qays rallied under the Qurayshite former aide of Mu'awiya I and Yazid, Dahhak ibn Qays al-Fihri, and challenged the Umayyad–Kalbi alliance at the Battle of Marj Rahit in 684. Some traditions hold that Zufar himself participated in this battle, but this was dismissed by the historians al-Ya'qubi and Awana ibn al-Hakam (d. 764); al-Tabari held that Zufar dispatched troops from Qinnasrin to join Dahhak's forces near Damascus. The Qays were routed, and Dahhak and several Qaysi chiefs were slain. A son of Zufar, Waki', may have also been killed. News of the defeat prompted Zufar to flee Qinnasrin for Qarqisiya. With his men, he ousted Qarqisiya's governor, Iyad al-Jurashi. (Note: Iyad ibn Aslam al-Jurashi was a tribesman of the South Arabian Himyar and had been appointed the governor of Qarqisiya by Caliph Yazid I.) Zufar fortified the city, which was strategically positioned at the confluence of the Euphrates and Khabur rivers, at the crossroads between Syria and Iraq. From there, he assumed preeminent leadership of the battered, but still powerful, Qaysi tribes, while maintaining his recognition of Ibn al-Zubayr as caliph.

Following his accession to the caliphate in Damascus, Marwan dispatched the veteran commander and statesman Ubayd Allah ibn Ziyad to wrest control of Iraq back from Mukhtar al-Thaqafi, the pro-Alid (supporters of Caliph Ali and his family) ruler of Kufa, and the Zubayrid rulers of Basra. On his way to Iraq, Ibn Ziyad campaigned against anti-Umayyad elements in the Jazira, besieging Zufar in Qarqisiya for about a year. Unable to dislodge Zufar, Ibn Ziyad continued on to Iraq, where he was defeated and slain by the forces of Mukhtar at the Battle of Khazir in 686. Qaysi opposition to the Umayyads played a role in their defeat at Khazir, when a Qaysi brigade commander, Umayr ibn al-Hubab of the Banu Sulaym, defected with his men during the battle. The Qaysi defectors at Khazir were "still smarting from their defeat at Marj Rahit", according to the historian Fred Donner.

==== Role in the ayyam tribal feuds ====
The Battle of Marj Rahit opened a bloody phase in the Qays–Kalb rivalry, as the Qays sought vengeance for their heavy losses. Other Syrian tribes that had opposed the Kalb and fought alongside the Qays at Marj Rahit, most prominently the South Arabian tribes of Jund Hims (the military district of Homs) and the Judham of Jund Filastin (the military district of Palestine), forged an alliance with the Kalb and their tribal allies, which became known as the Yaman group, alluding to the tribes' real or perceived origins in South Arabia (Yaman in Arabic). Collectively, the Yamani tribes dominated Syria's southern and central districts and stood in opposition to the Qays, which dominated Qinnasrin and the Jazira. The subsequent phase in the conflict was characterized by tit-for-tat raids known as ayyam ('days'), because each raid was typically a day long. The dates of these raids were not recorded, but Zufar led the first raid in an attack that killed twenty Kalbi tribesmen at a place called Musayyakh in the Syrian Desert, soon after setting up headquarters in Qarqisiya. The Kalb retaliated by killing sixty men from the Banu Numayr, a sub-tribe of the Amir, in Palmyra. This prompted an attack by Zufar at a place called Iklil, that ended with the deaths of 500–1,000 Kalbi tribesmen and Zufar's escape to Qarqisiya unscathed.

By circa 686, Zufar's participation in the Qays–Kalb conflict in the Syrian Desert was highly restricted by persistent campaigns against his safe haven at Qarqisiya by the Umayyad caliph Abd al-Malik (r. 685–705). His role as leader of the Qaysi raiding parties was increasingly filled by Umayr. The latter's tribesmen had been encroaching on the lands of the Taghlib tribe along the northern Khabur valley, causing tensions between the two tribes. Violence ensued when a tribesman of the Harish, a branch of the Amir, slaughtered a goat belonging to a Taghlibi, prompting its owner to raid the Harish. The Qays launched a counter-raid, killing three Taghlibis and seizing several of their camels. In response, the Taghlib requested Zufar's intervention to force the Sulaym to withdraw from the area, return the camels, and pay blood money for the dead tribesmen. Zufar accepted the last two demands, but was unable to persuade the Taghlib of the futility of forcing the Sulaym out of the Khabur Valley. The Taghlib then attacked Qaysi villages near Qarqisiya but were repulsed, while one of their men, Iyas ibn al-Kharraz, went to continue negotiations with Zufar. Iyas was killed by a Qaysi tribesman, prompting Zufar to pay compensation for his death. Julius Wellhausen saw in Zufar's early attempts at reconciliation a desire not to push the neutral and Christian Taghlib into joining the Umayyad–Yamani cause; the historian A. A. Dixon holds that the Taghlib were already pro-Umayyad and Zufar attempted to enlist their support against the Kalb, or at least ensure their neutrality in the conflict.

Map of the Jazira (Upper Mesopotamia), where the battles between Zufar and the Taghlib were fought. The Jazira was made a province not long after the conflict between Zufar and the Umayyads was settled.

Zufar failed to stem the tensions between the Sulaym and the Taghlib. Due to the Taghlib's insistence on evicting the Sulaym, Umayr opposed any peaceful settlement with the tribe, and worked to expel them from the area. He obtained a writ from Ibn al-Zubayr's brother and governor in Basra, Mus'ab ibn al-Zubayr, to collect the traditional dues owed to the state from the Taghlib, with the condition that it was subject to Zufar's approval. Zufar, seeking to prevent a clash between the Taghlib and Umayr, sent emissaries advising the Taghlib to cooperate and pay the dues to Umayr in the latter's capacity as a representative of the governor of Basra. The Taghlib responded by killing the emissaries, which angered Zufar. He consequently sent Umayr and a Qaysi party against them at Makisin, where a Taghlibi chief and several of his men were slain. In revenge, the Taghlib and their Rabi'a relatives landed a heavy blow against the Sulaym at the Tharthar river, killing several of their tribesmen and thirty women. The scale of the Taghlibi raid compelled Zufar to directly participate in the Qaysi feud with the tribe, which he had hitherto avoided. Consequently, he joined Umayr in a retaliatory assault against the tribe at the Tharthar. The Taghlib repulsed Zufar and the Amir, but the Sulaym held firm and defeated the Taghlib.

After several more tit-for-tat raids across eastern Syria and the Jazira, in 689, Zufar and Umayr faced the Taghlib at Hashshak near the Tharthar. Zufar retreated upon hearing of the approach of an Umayyad army to Qarqisiya, but Umayr remained and was killed. Zufar expressed his grief in verse. As head of the Qays, Zufar was expected to avenge his death. Umayr's brother, Tamim ibn al-Hubab, made a request of Zufar to that effect. Zufar was initially reluctant to act, but was persuaded by his eldest son, Hudhayl, to attack the Taghlib. He left his brother Aws ibn al-Harith to oversee Qarqisiya, while he and Hudhayl set out against the Taghlib. Zufar sent Muslim ibn Rabi'a, a man of the Banu Uqayl, a branch of the Amir, ahead of him to ambush a group of Taghlibi tribesmen. Afterward, Muslim assaulted the main body of the Taghlib at al-Aqiq near Mosul. The Taghlib fled toward the Tigris River, but once they reached the village of Kuhayl on the river's western bank, they were ambushed by Zufar. Scores of Taghlibi tribesmen were slain, and more drowned in the Tigris. Zufar executed two hundred Taghlibis taken captive in the raid. Referencing this event, the poet Jarir ibn Atiya taunted his Taghlibi rival al-Akhtal in the Umayyad court, reciting:

The warriors of Qays bore down on you with steeds
Ungroomed and grim-faced, [their backs] bearing heroes
You kept thinking everything after them
Was steeds and men charging over and over
Zufar Abu al-Hudhayl, their chieftain, annihilated you[r men]
Then captured your women and plundered your herds.

==== Umayyad assaults against Qarqisiya ====
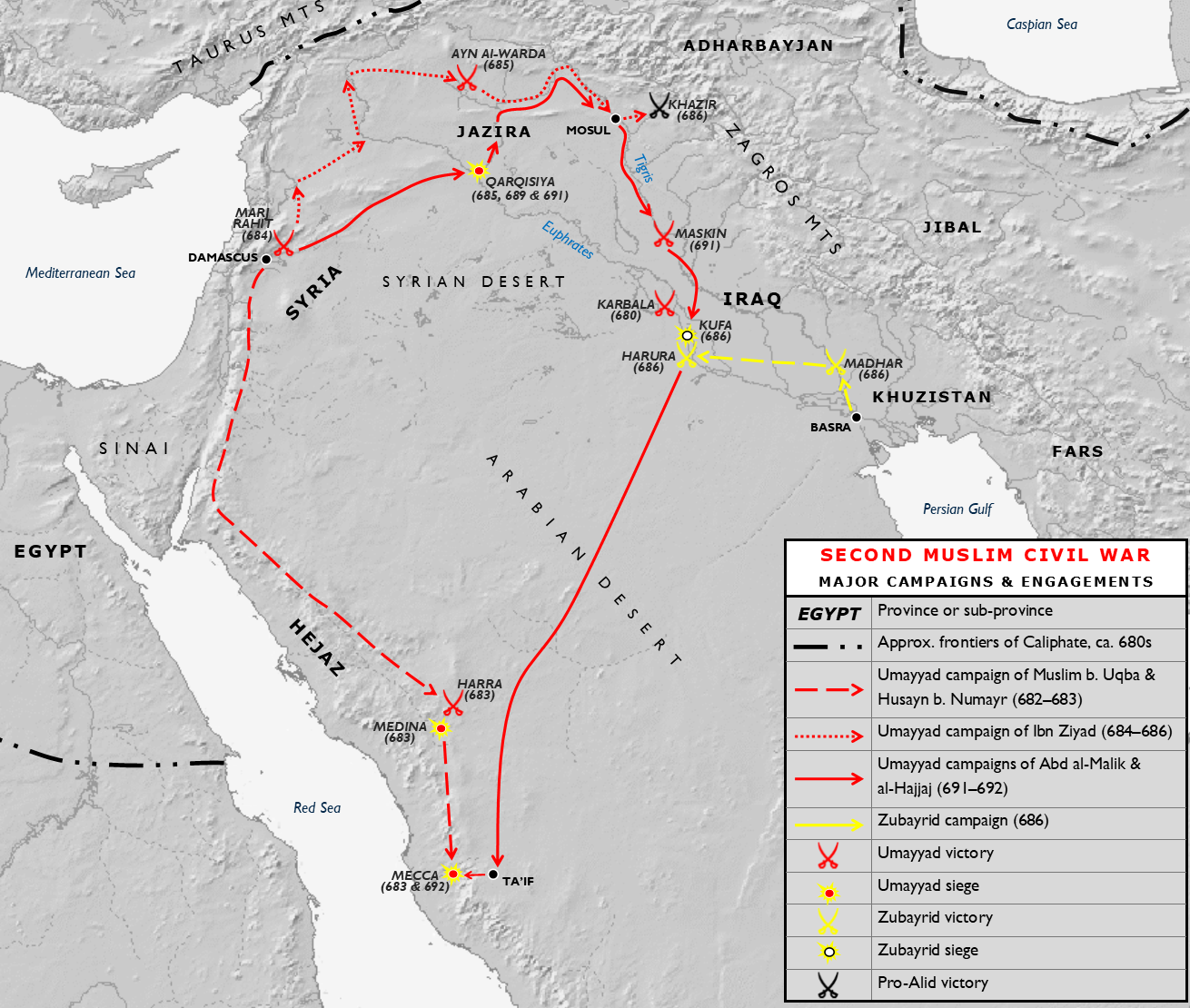
The main campaigns and battles of the Second Muslim Civil War, including the Umayyad sieges of Qarqisiya

Marwan had died in the spring of 685 and was succeeded by his son Abd al-Malik. Needing to consolidate his position in Syria, the new caliph initially refrained from confronting Zufar. After achieving a level of security at home, the caliph instructed his Umayyad kinsman and governor of Jund Hims, Aban ibn al-Walid ibn Uqba, to move against Zufar. In the ensuing battle in 688 or 689, Zufar was defeated and one of his sons slain, but he remained in control of Qarqisiya.

In 691, after stamping out a revolt in Damascus by his kinsman Amr al-Ashdaq, Abd al-Malik led his army in person on a campaign to take over Iraq, which by then had fallen entirely under Zubayrid control. Before entering Iraq, Abd al-Malik resolved to suppress Zufar and the Qays in the Jazira. He besieged Qarqisiya in the summer of 691. For forty days his catapults bombarded its fortifications, followed by an assault by his mostly Kalbi troops. Zufar and his men repulsed them, prompting Abd al-Malik to work toward a diplomatic resolution.

=== Reconciliation with the Umayyads ===
Abd al-Malik sent one of his top commanders, Hajjaj ibn Yusuf, and the prominent theologian Raja ibn Haywa, as his envoys to Zufar. The choice of envoys may have been meant to reassure Zufar. As a member of the Thaqif tribe, Hajjaj was a fellow Qaysi; Raja was affiliated with the Yamani Kinda, with whom Zufar had blood relations. They relayed Abd al-Malik's message: Zufar should join the majority of Muslims in recognizing Abd al-Malik as caliph, and in exchange be rewarded for his obedience, or otherwise punished for his recalcitrance. Zufar declined the offer, but his son Hudhayl gave it consideration. Abd al-Malik instructed his brother, Muhammad, who had been appointed by their father to keep the Qays in check in the Jazira, to issue pardons and grant unspecified favors to Zufar, Hudhayl and their followers. Zufar was persuaded by Hudhayl to accept Abd al-Malik's entreaties, on the condition that he would not have to join Abd al-Malik's forces and could maintain his oath of allegiance to Ibn al-Zubayr. The Kalbi commanders in Abd al-Malik's army were opposed to the negotiations with Zufar. They counseled the caliph to reject Zufar's conditions and continue the assault against Qarqisiya, as most of its fortifications had been destroyed by then. Abd al-Malik accepted their counsel and resumed the assault, but could not dislodge Zufar.

By the end of the summer of 691, Zufar and Abd al-Malik made peace. According to the terms of their agreement, safe conduct was granted to Zufar and his partisans, all of whom would be relieved of responsibility for their participation in the revolt, the tribesmen they killed, and the expenses incurred by the Umayyads in relation to the revolt. Zufar promised not to fight Abd al-Malik, and instructed Hudhayl to join his army in the Iraqi campaign, while staying out of the campaign himself to avoid violating his oath to Ibn al-Zubayr. Abd al-Malik gave Zufar an unspecified sum of money to distribute among his followers. Consecrating the agreement, Zufar's daughter Rabab was wed to Abd al-Malik's son, Maslama. According to Wellhausen, Zufar and his sons, Hudhayl and Kawthar, became "amongst the most eminent and notable people at the [Umayyad] court of Damascus".

In 692 Ibn al-Zubayr's revolt was suppressed and Zufar's war with the Kalb and Taghlib came to a halt. The Jazira was made its own province by Abd al-Malik at this time, separated administratively from Qinnasrin. According to the historian Khalid Yahya Blankinship, this was possibly related to the settlement with Zufar. Zufar's abandonment of Ibn al-Zubayr's cause in return for a high position in the Umayyad court and army effectively broke the Yaman's domination of the Syrian army. From then on, the Umayyad caliphs attempted to balance Qaysi–Yamani interests in the army. Qaysi troops were favored by Zufar's son-in-law, Maslama, during his abortive war against Byzantium in 717–718, which further consolidated the Yamani alliance against the Qays within the army. The tribal schism mainly continued as a factional rivalry for power in the provinces, but renewed Qaysi–Yamani hostilities in Syria in 744 helped spark the Third Muslim Civil War, which ended with the downfall of the Umayyads in 750.

== Descendants ==
Zufar died in c. 694–695. His sons "inherited the respect accorded to him" and were also "held in high esteem by the caliphs", in the words of the historian David S. Powers. The historian Patricia Crone noted that Zufar and his family "were considered to be the very incarnation of Qaysiyya". In an anecdote recorded by al-Tabari, in 722 or 723 the then Qaysi governor of Iraq, Umar ibn Hubayra, asked of his companions, "Who is the most eminent man among the Qays?", to which they replied that he was; Ibn Hubayra disagreed, countering that it was Zufar's son Kawthar, for all the latter had to do was "sound the bugle at night and twenty thousand men will show up without asking why they have been summoned".

Zufar's family, the Banu Zufar, was granted by the Umayyad caliphs a village or estate in Jund Qinnasrin near the fortress at Na'ura, a place downstream of Balis on the Euphrates. According to al-Tabari, this was the village of Khusaf, also called Zara'at Bani Zufar after the family, located in the vicinity of the Sabkhat al-Jabbul salt flats. The estate was near the residence of Abd al-Malik's son Maslama. Strong ties were maintained between the Banu Zufar and Maslama. Hudhayl became a commander in Maslama's service, commanding the left wing of his army when it suppressed the rebellion of Yazid ibn al-Muhallab in Iraq in 720. Hudhayl killed Yazid ibn al-Muhallab during that campaign, according to the historian Ibn al-Athir (d. 1233). The sons of Zufar were supporters of Caliph Marwan II (r. 744–750), who appointed Kawthar governor of Mar'ash on the Byzantine–Arab frontier. Zufar's grandsons Majza'a ibn Kawthar, better known as Abu al-Ward, and Wathiq ibn Hudhayl, were part of Marwan II's Qaysi entourage, but following Marwan II's defeat at the Battle of the Zab in 750, they submitted to the Abbasid Caliphate. Later that year, Abu al-Ward led a pro-Umayyad revolt against the Abbasids. He was killed, along with many members of his clan.

Family tree of Zufar ibn al-Harith al-Kilabi

Amr ibn Kilab
Nufayl (Note: Nufayl was the progenitor of one of the two sub-branches of the Amr branch of the Banu Kilab)
Khuwaylid 'al-Sa'iq' (Note: Khuwaylid ibn Nufayl was the chief of the Amr branch of the Banu Kilab and the paternal grandfather of Yazid ibn al-Sa'iq. Khuwaylid became remembered in the sources as 'al-Sa'iq' because he was supposedly killed in a lightning strike.)
Amr (Note: Amr ibn Khuwaylid 'al-Sa'iq' was the father of Yazid and Zur'a.)
Yazid	Zur'a (Note: Zur'a, a pre-Islamic noble of the Banu Amir tribe, was the father of Aslam, the Qaysi tribal-factional leader and one-time Umayyad governor of Basra.)
Caliph Marwan I (r. 684–685)	Al-Harith	Aslam
Caliph Abd al-Malik (r. 685–705)	Zufar	Aws	Sa'id (Note: Sa'id's father was Aslam ibn Zur'a. He served as the Umayyad governor of Makran.)
Maslama	Rabab	Hudhayl	Kawthar	Waki	Muslim (Note: Muslim, the son of Sa'id ibn Aslam, was the Umayyad governor of Khurasan.)
Wathiq	Majza'a (Abu al-Ward)

== Poetry ==
Fragments of Zufar's poems are preserved in Abu Ubayda's Naqa'id, Abu Tammam's 9th-century Hamasa and the 10th-century Iqd al-Farid and Kitab al-aghani poetry collections, as well as in the histories of al-Tabari and Ibn Asakir (d. 1175). The 9th-century scholar Ibn Habib worked on a diwan (poetry collection) of Zufar's poems, but it is not extant. Among the verses ascribed to him was the following about his hatred and despair in the aftermath of Marj Rahit and his resolve to avenge the Qays:

Do not think me heedless if I am absent, and do not rejoice at meeting me if I come to you.
The pasture land might spring up on the ruins of the earth, but the soul's hatreds remain just as before.
Do Kalb depart and our spears not reach them, and are the slain ones of Rahit abandoned as they were? ...
Never was anything hateful seen of me before this flight of mine and my leaving my two companions behind me...
Does one single day, if I have spoiled it, dispel the goodness of my days and the merit of my deeds?
There will be no peace until the horsemen come with spears, and my wives take vengeance from the women of Kalb.

== Bibliography ==
- Blankinship, Khalid Yahya (1994). The End of the Jihâd State: The Reign of Hishām ibn ʻAbd al-Malik and the Collapse of the Umayyads. Albany, New York: State University of New York Press. ISBN 978-0-7914-1827-7.
- Bonner, Michael (1996). Aristocratic Violence and Holy War: Studies in the Jihad and the Arab-Byzantine Frontier. New Haven, Connecticut: American Oriental Society. ISBN 0-940490-11-0.
- Brockett, Adrian, ed. (1997). The History of al-Ṭabarī, Volume XVI: The Community Divided: The Caliphate of ʿAlī I, A.D. 656–657/A.H. 35–36. SUNY Series in Near Eastern Studies. Albany, New York: State University of New York Press. ISBN 978-0-7914-2391-2.
- Caskel, Werner (1960). "'Amir b. Sa'sa'a". In Gibb, H. A. R.; Kramers, J. H.; Lévi-Provençal, E.; Schacht, J.; Lewis, B. & Pellat, Ch. (eds.). The Encyclopaedia of Islam, Second Edition. Volume I: A–B. Leiden: E. J. Brill. OCLC 495469456.
- Caskel, Werner (1966). Ğamharat an-nasab: Das genealogische Werk des His̆ām ibn Muḥammad al-Kalbī, Volume II (in German). Leiden: Brill. OCLC 29957469.
- Cobb, Paul M. (2001). White Banners: Contention in 'Abbasid Syria, 750–880. Albany: SUNY Press. ISBN 978-0-7914-4880-9.
- Crone, Patricia (1980). Slaves on Horses: The Evolution of the Islamic Polity (1980 ed.). Cambridge: Cambridge University Press. ISBN 978-0521229616.
- Crone, Patricia (1994). "Were the Qays and Yemen of the Umayyad Period Political Parties?" (PDF). Der Islam. 71 (1): 1–57. doi:10.1515/islm.1994.71.1.1. S2CID 154370527. Archived from the original (PDF) on 15 January 2025.
- Dixon, 'Abd al-Ameer (1971). The Umayyad Caliphate, 65–86/684–705: (A Political Study). London: Luzac. ISBN 978-0-7189-0149-3.
- Donner, Fred M. (2010). Muhammad and the Believers, at the Origins of Islam. Cambridge, Massachusetts and London: Harvard University Press. ISBN 978-0-674-05097-6.
- Gordon, Matthew S.; Robinson, Chase F.; Rowson, Everett K.; Fishbein, Michael (2018). The Works of Ibn Wāḍiḥ al-Yaʿqūbī (Volume 3): An English Translation. Leiden: Brill. ISBN 978-90-04-35621-4.
- Hagler, Aaron M. (12 August 2011). The Echoes of Fitna: Developing Historiographical Interpretations of the Battle of Siffin (PhD thesis). University of Pennsylvania. Archived from the original on 28 January 2021.
- Hawting, G. R., ed. (1989). The History of al-Ṭabarī, Volume XX: The Collapse of Sufyānid Authority and the Coming of the Marwānids: The Caliphates of Muʿāwiyah II and Marwān I and the Beginning of the Caliphate of ʿAbd al-Malik, A.D. 683–685/A.H. 64–66. SUNY Series in Near Eastern Studies. Albany, New York: State University of New York Press. ISBN 978-0-88706-855-3.
- Hawting, Gerald R. (2000). The First Dynasty of Islam: The Umayyad Caliphate AD 661–750 (Second ed.). London and New York: Routledge. ISBN 0-415-24072-7.
- Hoyland, Robert G. (2011). Theophilus of Edessa's Chronicle and the Circulation of Historical Knowledge in Late Antiquity and Early Islam. Liverpool: Liverpool University Press. ISBN 978-1-84631-697-5.
- Humphreys, R. Stephen, ed. (1990). The History of al-Ṭabarī, Volume XV: The Crisis of the Early Caliphate: The Reign of ʿUthmān, A.D. 644–656/A.H. 24–35. SUNY Series in Near Eastern Studies. Albany, New York: State University of New York Press. ISBN 978-0-7914-0154-5.
- Kennedy, Hugh (2016) [1986]. The Prophet and the Age of the Caliphates: The Islamic Near East from the 6th to the 11th Century (Third ed.). Abingdon, Oxon and New York: Routledge. ISBN 978-1-138-78761-2.
- Krenkow, F. (1993) [1927]. "Kilāb b. Rabīʿa". The Encyclopædia of Islam: A Dictionary of the Geography, Ethnography and Biography of the Muhammadan Peoples, Volume IV: ʿItk-Kwaṭṭa (Reprint ed.). Leiden, New York and Koln: Brill. p. 1005. ISBN 90-04-08265-4.
- Lane, Andrew (2006). A Traditional Mu'tazilite Qur'ān Commentary: The Kashshāf of Jār Allāh al-Zamakhsharī (d. 538/1144). Leiden: Brill. ISBN 90-04-14700-4.
- Lyall, Charles (1918). The Mufaḍḍalīyāt: An Anthology of Ancient Arabian Odes, Volume 2. Oxford: Clarendon Press. OCLC 697581889.
- Pellat, Ch. (1960). "Al-Baṣra — Baṣra until the Mongol conquest (656/1258)". In Gibb, H. A. R.; Kramers, J. H.; Lévi-Provençal, E.; Schacht, J.; Lewis, B. & Pellat, Ch. (eds.). The Encyclopaedia of Islam, Second Edition. Volume I: A–B. Leiden: E. J. Brill. pp. 1085–1086. OCLC 495469456.
- Powers, David S., ed. (1989). The History of al-Ṭabarī, Volume XXIV: The Empire in Transition: The Caliphates of Sulaymān, ʿUmar, and Yazīd, A.D. 715–724/A.H. 96–105. SUNY Series in Near Eastern Studies. Albany, New York: State University of New York Press. ISBN 978-0-7914-0072-2.
- Rotter, Gernot (1982). Die Umayyaden und der zweite Bürgerkrieg (680-692) (in German). Wiesbaden: Deutsche Morgenländische Gesellschaft. ISBN 3-515-02913-3.
- Saffarini, Husein (2003). "A Critical Evaluation of the Traditions Utilized in Historical Works by the Transmitters". Studia Arabistyczne i Islamistyczne. 11: 79–96.
- Sezgin, Fuat (1975). Geschichte des arabischen schriftums, Band II, Poesie bis ca. 430H (in German). Leiden: Brill. ISBN 90-04-043764.
- Stetkevych, Suzanne Pinckney (2002). The Poetics of Islamic Legitimacy: Myth, Gender, and Ceremony in the Classical Arabic Ode. Bloomington: Indiana University Press. ISBN 0-253-34119-1.
- Wellhausen, Julius (1927). The Arab Kingdom and Its Fall. Translated by Margaret Graham Weir. Calcutta: University of Calcutta.
- Williams, John Alden, ed. (1985). The History of al-Ṭabarī, Volume XXVII: The ʿAbbāsid Revolution, A.D. 743–750/A.H. 126–132. SUNY Series in Near Eastern Studies. Albany, New York: State University of New York Press. ISBN 978-0-87395-884-4.
- Zakkar, Suhayl (1971). The Emirate of Aleppo: 1004–1094. Aleppo: Dar al-Amanah. OCLC 759803726.
