= Aban ibn al-Walid ibn Uqba =

7th century Umayyad governor

Abān ibn al-Walīd ibn ʿUqba أبان بن الوليد بن عقبة

Governor of Hims, Qinnasrin and Arminiya
- In office 684–691
- Monarchs: Marwan I Abd al-Malik
- Preceded by: Nu'man ibn Bashir (Homs)
- Succeeded by: Abdallah ibn Abd al-Malik (Homs); Muhammad ibn Marwan (Qinnasrin/Arminiya)

Personal details
- Relations: Umayyad dynasty (tribe)
- Parent: Al-Walid ibn Uqba (father)
- Relatives: Al-Walid ibn Hisham (nephew); Uthman ibn al-Walid (brother)

Military service
- Allegiance: Umayyad Caliphate
- Battles/wars: Second Fitna; Arab–Byzantine wars; Battle of Marash

Aban ibn al-Walid ibn Uqba ibn Abi Mu'ayt (Arabic: أبان بن الوليد بن عقبة بن أبي معيط, romanized: Abān ibn al-Walīd ibn ʿUqba ibn Abī Muʿayṭ) was a member of the Umayyad family who served as governor of Hims, Qinnasrin (with the Jazira) and Armenia for the caliphs Marwan I (r. 684–685) and Abd al-Malik (r. 685–705). His brother Uthman may have been his deputy in Armenia, or a governor in his own right, while another deputy of his was Dinar ibn Dinar, a mawla of Abd al-Malik who was in charge of Qinnasrin. In August/September 694, when Byzantine forces advanced from the direction of Marash towards the Amaq, Aban and Dinar marched to intercept them, meeting the enemy at Marash where they decisively defeated the Byzantines and pursued the fleeing forces. Later that year, Dinar also defeated a Byzantine force at Jisr Yaghra near Samsat.

In circa 688/89, Abd al-Malik tasked Aban with suppressing the rebellion of the Qaysi chieftain Zufar ibn al-Harith al-Kilabi, who, from his fortified, strategic outpost of al-Qarqisiya on the Euphrates, posed a nagging obstacle to the caliph's planned conquest of Iraq. That province was controlled by Mus'ab ibn al-Zubayr on behalf of his Mecca-based brother, Abd Allah, a rival caliph to Abd al-Malik. Zufar recognized the suzerainty of Ibn al-Zubayr and had previously staved off the Umayyad commander, Ubayd Allah ibn Ziyad, in 685/86. Aban defeated Zufar in battle, during which Zufar's son, Waki', was killed. This death turned the conflict into a personal vendetta, making it much harder for Abd al-Malik to negotiate with Zufar until several years later.

Descendants of Abu Amr ibn Umayya (Banu Abi Mu'ayt)

Umayya
Harb	Abu al-As	Abu Amr Dhakwan	Al-As	Abu al-Is
Sufyanids	Uthmanids	Marwanids	Abu Mu'ayt Aban	Musafir
Uqba
Umara	Umm Kulthum	al-Walid	Hisham	Khalid
Aban	Abu Qatifa Amr	Hisham	Uthman	Khalid
Muhammad	al-Walid	Khalid
Yusuf
Abdallah al-Mu'ayti

Dashed line indicates skipped generation(s)
Italicized indicates other Umayyad families/lineages
Third Rashidun caliph Uthman (r. 644–656) and descendants
Ruling dynasty of Umayyad Caliphate, 661–684
Ruling dynasty of Umayyad Caliphate, 684–750

== Sources ==
- Crone, Patricia (1980). Slaves on Horses: The Evolution of the Islamic Polity (1980 ed.). Cambridge: Cambridge University Press. ISBN 978-0521229616.
- Dixon, 'Abd al-Ameer (1971). The Umayyad Caliphate, 65–86/684–705: (A Political Study). London: Luzac. ISBN 978-0718901493.
- Rotter, Gernot (1982). Die Umayyaden und der zweite Bürgerkrieg (680-692) (in German). Wiesbaden: Deutsche Morgenländische Gesellschaft. ISBN 3-515-02913-3.
- Al-Baladhuri, Ahmad ibn Yahya (2022). Kennedy, Hugh (ed.). History of the Arab Invasions: The Conquest of the Lands: A New Translation of al-Baladhuri's Futuh al-Buldan. Bloomsbury Publishing. ISBN 9780755637416.
