= Al-Walid ibn Uqba =

Governor of Kufa (died 680)

Governor of Kufa
- In office 645/46–649/50
- Monarch: Uthman
- Preceded by: Sa'd ibn Abi Waqqas
- Succeeded by: Sa'id ibn al-As

Personal details
- Born: Mecca, Hejaz, Arabia
- Died: 680 Raqqa, Syria
- Children: Aban; Amr; Hisham; Uthman
- Parent(s): Uqba ibn Abi Mu'ayt (father); Arwa bint Kurayz (mother)
- Relatives: Uthman (half-brother); Al-Walid ibn Hisham (grandson)

Al-Walīd ibn ʿUqba ibn Abī Muʿayṭ (Arabic: الْوَلِيْد ابْنِ عُقبَة ابْنِ أَبِيّ مُعَيْط, died 680) was the governor of Kufa in 645/46–649/50 during the reign of his half-brother, Caliph Uthman (r. 644–656).

During the reign of Uthman, he led Fajr prayers while intoxicated, and there were witness of him vomiting, as mentioned in Hadith 4457 of Sahih Muslim. Therefore, the legal punishment of whipping was carried out on him, and according to some accounts, with Ali's hand.

== Life ==
Al-Walid was born in Mecca to father Uqba ibn Abi Mu'ayt of the Banu Umayya clan and mother Arwa bint Kurayz of the Banu Rabi'ah. Both of his parents belonged to clans from the Banu Abd Shams branch of the Quraysh tribe, which dominated Mecca. He was also a maternal half-brother of Uthman ibn Affan, a member of the Banu Umayya who went on to become caliph in 644. Like most Meccans at the time, his family were polytheists and opposed Muhammad. His father died fighting against the latter at the Battle of Badr in 624. However, al-Walid converted to Islam after the Muslim conquest of Mecca in 630. He was charged by Muhammad with collecting the sadaqat (charitable tribute) from an Arab tribe known as the Banu Mustaliq.

During the rule of Caliph Umar (r. 634–644), al-Walid was charged with collecting the sadaqat from the Banu Taghlib tribe in Upper Mesopotamia. Later he involved during Muslim conquest of the Levant, when he was sent by Iyad ibn Ghanm to subdue the fortresses of the tribe of Rabi'a and Tanukhid in Jazira, in an attempt to relieve the Byzantine coalition pressures toward Emesa.

His uterine brother, Uthman, appointed him governor of Kufa in 645/46, but his behavior and wine consumption riled the pious Muslims of that city, compelling Uthman to recall him in 649/50. He fled to Upper Mesopotamia following Uthman's assassination in 656 and died in al-Raqqa in 680. His son Aban served as governor of Homs under Caliph Abd al-Malik.

Descendants of Abu Amr ibn Umayya (Banu Abi Mu'ayt)

Umayya
Harb	Abu al-As	Abu Amr Dhakwan	Al-As	Abu al-Is
Sufyanids	Uthmanids	Marwanids	Abu Mu'ayt Aban	Musafir
Uqba
Umara	Umm Kulthum	al-Walid	Hisham	Khalid
Aban	Abu Qatifa Amr	Hisham	Uthman	Khalid
Muhammad	al-Walid	Khalid
Yusuf
Abdallah al-Mu'ayti

Dashed line indicates skipped generation(s)
Italicized indicates other Umayyad families/lineages
Third Rashidun caliph Uthman (r. 644–656) and descendants
Ruling dynasty of Umayyad Caliphate, 661–684
Ruling dynasty of Umayyad Caliphate, 684–750

== Sources ==
- Bosworth, C. E. (2002). "Al-Walīd b. ʿUkba". In Bearman, P. J.; Bianquis, Th.; Bosworth, C. E.; van Donzel, E. & Heinrichs, W. P. (eds.). The Encyclopaedia of Islam, Second Edition. Volume XI: W–Z. Leiden: E. J. Brill. p. 130. ISBN 978-90-04-12756-2.
