= Uthman =

Rashidun caliph from 644 to 656

Uthman عُثْمَان
- Amir al-Mu'minin; Khalifat Allah; Amin Allah; Dhū al-Nūrayn
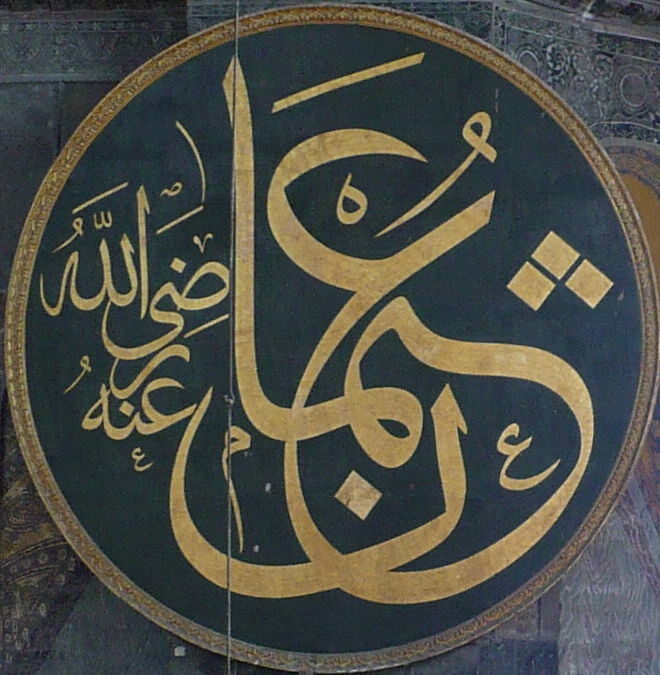
- Calligraphic seal featuring Uthman's name, on display in the Hagia Sophia, Istanbul, Turkey

3rd Caliph of the Rashidun Caliphate
- Reign: 6 November 644 – 17 June 656 (11 years, 225 days)
- Predecessor: Umar
- Successor: Ali
- Born: c. 576 CE; Mecca or Taif, Hejaz, Arabia
- Died: 17 June 656 CE (aged 79–80) (18 Dhu al-Hijjah 35 AH); Medina, Hejaz, Rashidun Caliphate
- Burial: Al-Baqi Cemetery, Medina
- Spouse: Ruqayya bint Muhammad; Umm Kulthum bint Muhammad; Fakhita bint Ghazwan; Asma bint Abi Jahl; Mulayka bint Uyayna; Fatima bint al-Walid; Bint Khalid ibn Asid; Umm Amr Umm Najm bint Jundab; Ramla bint Shayba; Bunana; Na'ila bint al-Furafisa
- Issue (among others): Amr; Aban; Sa'id; Abd Allah
- Tribe: Quraysh (Banu Umayya)
- Father: Affan ibn Abi al-As
- Mother: Arwa bint Kurayz
- Religion: Islam

Uthman ibn Affan (Arabic: عُثْمَان بْن عَفَّان, romanized: ʿUthmān ibn ʿAffān; c. 576 CE – 17 June 656 CE) was the third and longest-reigned Rashidun caliph, ruling from 644 until his assassination in 656. He was also a second cousin, son-in-law, and senior companion of the Islamic prophet Muhammad, and played a major role in early Islamic history. He is most famously known for the compilation and distribution of the standardized version of the Quran during his reign, known as the Uthmanic codex. This standardization established a uniform written text of the Quran, and the Uthmanic codex forms the basis of the Quran used by Muslims today.

Before the second caliph Umar died, he had appointed a council of six companions to select his successor. Uthman, then aged 68, was elected to succeed him, becoming the oldest person to ascend to the caliphal office. During his reign, the caliphate expanded further into Persia and reached as far as the provinces of Khorasan and Transoxiana in the east, to Ifriqiya and the Iberian Peninsula in the west. Uthman also instituted centralized reforms aimed at creating a more cohesive administrative structure and fostered rapid economic growth.

However, the last years of his reign were marked by discontent over his fiscal policies and the appointment of members of his relatives to key positions. These grievances eventually evolved into an armed revolt, as opposition groups gathered in Medina and besieged his residence. Despite efforts by his supporters and companions to defend him, Uthman was ultimately assassinated by the rebels in 656 CE, an event that contributed to the political and sectarian conflicts that followed. Sunni Muslim tradition considers him the third rightly-guided caliph.

== Family and early life ==
Uthman was born in Mecca in 576. He was a leading figure of the influential Banu Abd Shams clan of the Quraysh tribe and its leading family, the Banu Umayya, the most powerful family of the Quraysh on the eve of Islam in the early 7th century. His father belonged to the Abu al-As line of the Umayya, while his mother, Arwa bint Kurayz, belonged to another family of the Abd Shams. According to Asad Ahmed, this ancestry provided Uthman "an impeccable lineage" in Meccan society, with paternal and maternal roots in the close knit Abd Shams clan. Uthman's father, Affan ibn Abi al-As, was a merchant and Uthman often accompanied him on his travels. Uthman took up trade and became "a very rich merchant and accomplished man", in the words of Giorgio Levi Della Vida.

== Companionship of Muhammad ==
=== Conversion to Islam ===
Uthman was an early companion of Muhammad, the prophet of Islam. Muhammad's 8th-century biographer, Ibn Ishaq, holds that Uthman had been brought to Muhammad by an earlier convert, Abu Bakr. According to the narrative of the 9th-century Medinan scholar Ibn Sa'd (citing an earlier scholar, al-Waqidi), Uthman had been resting on his return from a trade mission in Syria when he was awoken by Muhammad's prophetic proclamation in Mecca; he speedily returned to Mecca and accepted Islam in Muhammad's presence. By this account, Uthman became the fourth Muslim convert and was counted among the few men to have embraced Islam before Muhammad's relocation to the home of al-Arqam ibn Abi al-Arqam. The early and public conversion of Uthman gave him sabiqa (precedence in Islam), a special merit indicating they suffered in the early persecution of the Muslim community. Uthman's uncle, al-Hakam ibn Abi al-As, pressured him to abandon Islam but eventually relented when Uthman refused.

=== Migration to Abyssinia ===
To escape persecution, Uthman and his wife Ruqayya migrated to Abyssinia (modern Ethiopia) in April 615, along with ten Muslim men and three women. Scores of Muslims joined them later. As Uthman already had some business contacts in Abyssinia, he continued to practice his profession as a trader and flourish.

After four years, the news spread among the Muslims in Abyssinia that the Quraysh of Mecca had accepted Islam, and this persuaded Uthman, Ruqayya and 39 Muslims to return. However, when they reached Mecca, they found that the news about the Quraysh's acceptance of Islam was false; nevertheless, Uthman and Ruqayya re-settled in Mecca. Uthman had to start his business afresh, but the contacts that he had already established in Abyssinia worked in his favour and his business prospered once again.

=== Migration to Medina ===
In 622, Uthman and his wife Ruqayya were among the third group of Muslims to migrate to Medina. Upon arrival, Uthman stayed with Abu Talha ibn Thabit before moving into the house he purchased a short time later. Uthman was one of the richest merchants of Mecca, with no need of financial help from the Ansar, as he had brought the considerable fortune he had amassed with him to Medina. Most Muslims of Medina were farmers with little interest in trade, which was thus primarily conducted by Jews in the town. Recognizing a commercial opportunity to promote trade among Muslims, Uthman quickly established himself as a merchant and eventually became one of the richest men in Medina. Two of Uthman's wives, Ruqayya and Umm Kulthum, were elder daughters of Muhammad and Khadija bint Khuwaylid, which earned him the honorific title Dhū al-Nurayn ("The Possessor of Two Lights").

Across the Muslim world, Uthman is known by his honorific title "Ghani" that translates to "exceedingly generous" which was bestowed upon him for his remarkable donations towards helping those in need and for the cause of Islam. When Ali married Fatima, Uthman bought Ali's shield for five hundred dirhams. Four hundred was set aside as mahr (dower) for Fatima's marriage, leaving a hundred for all other expenses. Later, Uthman presented the shield back to Ali as a wedding present.

=== Life in Medina ===
Uthman participated in several military expeditions of the early Islamic period, though he did not join the Battle of Badr, as Muhammad commanded him to remain in Medina to take care of his wife and Muhammad's daughter, Ruqayya, during her terminal illness; Muhammad granted him a share in the spoils of war as if he had been present. During the Battle of Uhud, Uthman was among those who retreated, an event for which he was said to be forgiven by a Qur'anic revelation.^{[ 3:155 -The Clear Quran]}

In the immediate aftermath of Uhud, Uthman joined the Battle of Hamra al-Asad, during which he acted as a protector for Mu'awiya ibn al-Mughira. He was also among the riders who accompanied Muhammad during the Siege of Banu Qurayza. Following the siege, Uthman purchased a portion of the captives from Muhammad, an action intended to help secure weapons and horses for the military. During the campaigns of Ghatafan and Dhat al-Riqa, Muhammad left Uthman in charge of Medina when the Muslim army ventured out of the city.

In 628, when Muhammad and the Muslims headed toward Mecca to perform Umrah, they were stopped at Hudaybiyya by the Quraysh. After other attempts at negotiation failed, Muhammad dispatched Uthman as his envoy to inform the Meccan leaders that the Muslims intended a peaceful pilgrimage. The Quraysh received Uthman well and offered him the opportunity to perform the circumambulation of the Kaaba, but he declined to do so while Muhammad was barred from entering.

When Uthman’s return was delayed, rumors spread that he had been killed. In response, Muhammad summoned his companions to the Pledge of the Tree (Bay'ah al-Ridwan), where they pledged their fidelity. Because Uthman was absent, Muhammad placed his own hand over his other, declaring it to represent Uthman’s pledge. Shortly thereafter, Uthman returned safely, and the negotiations concluded with the signing of the treaty.

In 630, Uthman played a significant role in the Expedition of Tabuk by providing the largest individual financial contribution for the army of 30,000 men and 10,000 cavalry. Ibn Ishaq records that Uthman personally equipped one-third of the army and donated 1,000 gold dinars to support the campaign, a contribution noted for its unprecedented scale among the companions.

== Role during Abu Bakr's caliphate (632–634) ==
Uthman had a very close relationship with Abu Bakr, as it was due to him that Uthman had converted to Islam. When Abu Bakr was elected as caliph, Uthman was the first person after Umar to offer his allegiance. During the Ridda Wars (Wars of Apostasy), Uthman remained in Medina, acting as Abu Bakr's adviser. On his deathbed, Abu Bakr dictated his will to Uthman and Abd al-Rahman ibn Awf, nominating Umar as his successor.

== Election of Uthman ==
On his deathbed, Umar formed a committee of six people, all from the Muhajirun (early Meccan converts), to choose the next caliph from amongst themselves. The committee was:

- Uthman ibn Affan
- Ali ibn Abi Talib
- Abd al-Rahman ibn Awf
- Sa'd ibn Abi Waqqas
- Zubayr ibn al-Awwam
- Talha ibn Ubayd Allah

According to History of al-Yaʿqūbī, Umar instructed Abu Talha al-Ansari: "If four people gave an opinion and two disagreed, behead those two, and if three agreed and three disagreed, the three people whom Abd al-Rahman is not among them, behead them, and if three days passed and they didn't reach an agreement on anyone, behead them all".

Al-Yaʿqūbī further adds that many negotiations took place in these three days and the result was stalled between Ali and Uthman. Following the instructions of Umar, Abd al-Rahman ibn Awf spent three days after Umar's passing engaged in prayer, supplication, and seeking divine guidance (Istikhara), while also consulting with men of wisdom to select the next Caliph. Ibn Awf first asked Ali: "If we pledge allegiance to you, would you be willing to follow the Book of God (Quran) and the Sunnah of the Messenger of God and behave in the manner of the two previous caliphs (Umar and Abu Bakr)?" Ali's answer to Ibn Awf was: "I will only follow the Book of God and the Sunnah of the Messenger of God". Ibn Awf then asked the same question to Uthman, who answered positively and accepted all conditions. Uthman was thus chosen as the Caliph.

== Caliphate ==
In about 650, Uthman began noticing slight differences in recitations of the Quran as Islam expanded beyond the Arabian Peninsula into Persia, the Levant, and North Africa. In order to preserve the sanctity of the text, he ordered a committee headed by Zayd ibn Thabit to use caliph Abu Bakr's copy and prepare a standardised version of the Quran. Thus, within 20 years of Muhammad's death, the Quran was committed to written form. That text became the model from which copies were made and promulgated throughout the urban centers of the Muslim world, with the other versions ordered to be burnt by Uthman.

While Shī'as use the same Qur'an as Sunnis, they do not believe that it was first compiled by Uthman. Rather, Shī'as believe that the Qur'an was gathered and compiled by Muhammad during his lifetime.

=== Economic and social administration ===
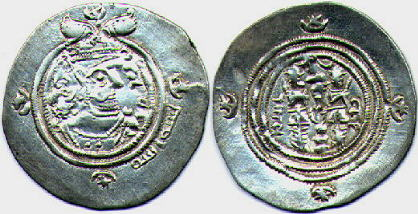
Sassanid style coins in circulation during the reign of Uthman, (Pahlavi scripts, crescent-star, fire altar, depictions of Khosrow II, Arabic bismillāh in margin).

Uthman was a businessman and a successful trader from his youth, which contributed greatly to the Rashidun Caliphate. Umar had established a public allowance and, on assuming office, Uthman increased it by about 25%. Umar had, as part of his desire for the Arabs to remain a class of rulers and warriors, forbade them to purchase agricultural land or become farmers in conquered territories. Uthman withdrew these restrictions, as the trade could not flourish. Uthman also permitted people to draw loans from the public treasury. Under Umar, it had been laid down as a policy that the lands in conquered territories were not to be distributed among the combatants but were to remain the property of the previous owners. The army felt dissatisfied at this decision, but Umar suppressed the opposition with a strong hand. Uthman followed the policy devised by Umar and there were more conquests, and the revenues from land increased considerably.

Umar had been strict in the use of money from the public treasury—indeed, apart from the meagre allowance that had been sanctioned in his favour, Umar took no money from the treasury, did not receive any gifts, and forbade his family members from accepting gifts from any quarter. Under Uthman, these restrictions were partially relaxed—unlike Umar, Uthman accepted gifts from certain quarters (and allowed his family members to do likewise), but, being a wealthy man already, Uthman continued Umar's policy of neither drawing a personal allowance from the treasury nor receiving a salary. In general, Uthman asserted that he had the right to us the public funds as best he judged fit. His economic reforms had far-reaching effects, and his reign is considered to have marked a period of prosperity for the Rashidun Caliphate.

During his Caliphate, Uthman sent an embassy to the Chinese Tang Empire's court at Chang'an.

=== Military expansion ===
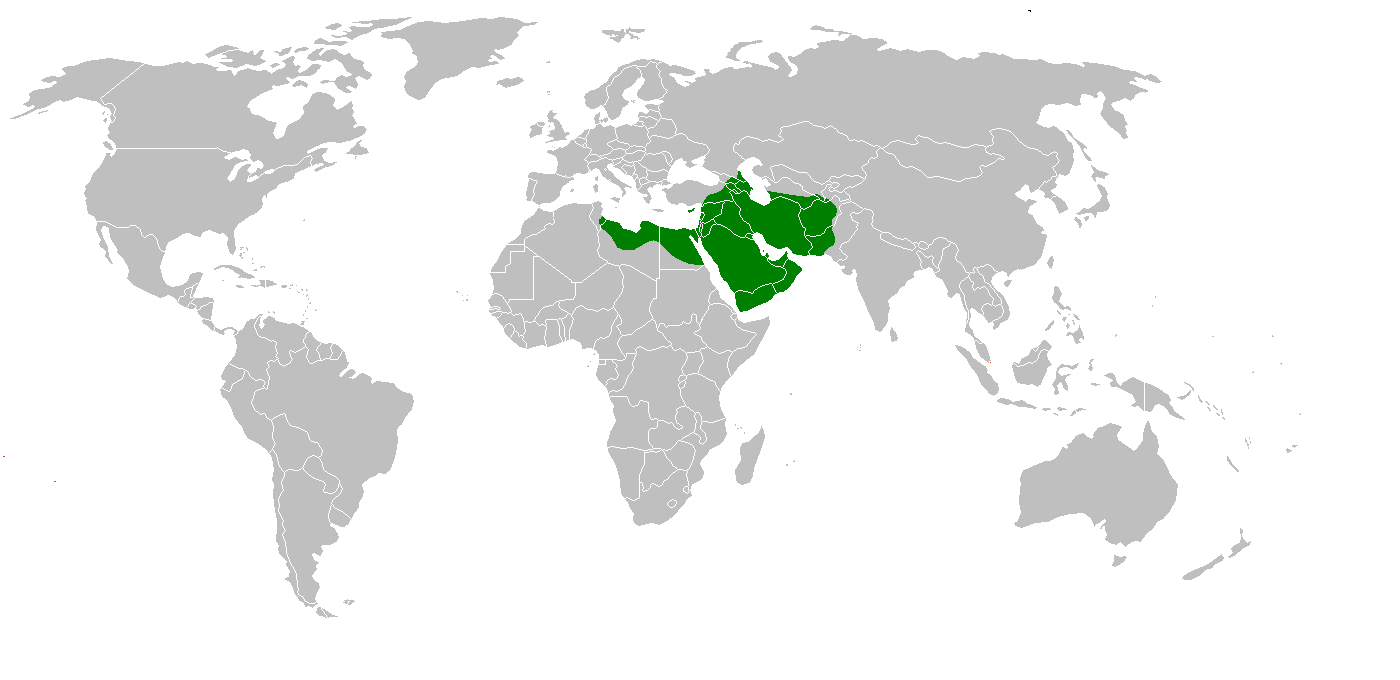
Rashidun Caliphate at its peak under Uthman (654)

During his rule, Uthman's military-style was more autonomical in nature as he delegated much military authority to his trusted kinsmen – e.g., Abd Allah ibn Amir, Mu'awiya ibn Abi Sufyan and Abd Allah ibn Sa'd – unlike Umar's more centralized policy. Consequently, this more independent policy allowed more expansion until Sindh, in modern Pakistan, which had not been touched during the tenure of Umar. The conquest of Armenia had begun by the 640s.

Mu'awiya had been appointed as the governor of Syria by Umar, succeeding his elder brother Yazid ibn Abi Sufyan, who died in a plague. Now under Uthman's rule in 649, Mu'awiya was allowed to set up a navy, manned by Monophysitic Christians, Copts, and Jacobite Syrian Christian sailors and Muslim troops, which defeated the Byzantine navy at the Battle of the Masts in 655, opening up the Mediterranean.

In c. 647, Uthman sent Abd Allah ibn al-Zubayr and Abd Allah ibn Sa'd to conquer the Maghreb, where he met the army of Gregory, Exarch of Africa and relative of Heraclius, which is recorded to have numbered between 120,000 and 200,000 soldiers, The opposing forces clashed at Sufetula, which became the name of this battle. Records from al-Bidayah wal Nihayah state that Ibn Sa'd's troops were completely surrounded by Gregory's army. However, Abd Allah ibn al-Zubayr spotted Gregory in his chariot and asked Abd Allah ibn Sa'd to lead a small detachment to intercept him. The interception was successful, and Gregory was slain by Ibn al-Zubayr's ambush party. Consequently, the morale of Byzantine army started crumbling and soon they were routed.

According to al-Tabari, after the conquest of North Africa was completed, Abd Allah ibn Sa'd continued to Spain. Other prominent Muslim historians, like Ibn Kathir, have also quoted the same narration. In the description of this campaign, two of Ibn Sa'd's generals, Abdullah ibn Nafiah ibn Husain and Abdullah ibn Nafi ibn Abdul Qais, were ordered to invade the coastal areas of Spain by sea, aided by a Berber force. They allegedly succeeded in conquering the coastal areas of Al-Andalus. It is not known where the Muslim force landed, what resistance they met, and what parts of Spain they actually conquered. However, it is apparent that the Muslims did conquer some portion of Spain during Uthman's reign, presumably establishing colonies on its coast. On the occasion, Uthman is reported to have addressed a letter to the invading force:

Constantinople will be conquered from the side of Al-Andalus. Thus, if you conquer it, you will have the honor of taking the first step towards the conquest of Constantinople. You will have your reward in this behalf both in this world and the next.

Abd Allah ibn Sa'd also achieved success in the Caliphate's first decisive naval battle against the Byzantine Empire, the Battle of the Masts.

To the east, al-Ahnaf ibn Qays, the chief of Banu Tamim and a veteran commander who had conquered Shushtar earlier, launched a series of further military expansions by further crushing Yazdegerd III near the Oxus River in Turkmenistan and later defeating a military coalition of Sassanid loyalists and Hephthalites in the Siege of Herat. Later, the governor of Basra, Abd Allah ibn Amir also led a number of successful campaigns, ranging from the suppression of revolts in Fars, Kerman, Sistan, and Khorasan, to the opening of new fronts for conquest in Transoxiana and Afghanistan.

In the next year, in 652, Futuh al-Buldan of Baladhuri writes that Balochistan was re-conquered during the campaign against the revolt in Kermān, under the command of Majasha ibn Mas'ud. It was the first time that western Balochistan had come directly under the laws of the Caliphate and it paid an agricultural tribute. The military campaigns under Uthman's rule were generally successful, except for a few in Nubia, on the lower Nile.

=== Public opposition to Uthman's policies ===
==== Reasons for the opposition ====
Noting an increase in anti-government tension around the Caliphate, Uthman's administration decided to determine its origins, extent, and aims. Sometime around 654, Uthman called all twelve provincial governors to Medina to discuss the problem. During this council of governors, Uthman ordered that all resolutions of the council be adopted according to local circumstances. Later, in the Majlis al-Shura (council of ministers), it was suggested to Uthman that reliable agents be sent to various provinces to attempt to determine the source of the discontent. Uthman accordingly sent Muhammad ibn Maslamah to Kufa, Usama ibn Zayd to Basra, Ammar ibn Yasir to Egypt, and Abd Allah ibn Umar to Syria. The agents sent to Kufa, Basra and Syria reported that all was well – the people were generally satisfied with the administration, although some individuals had minor personal grievances. Ammar ibn Yasir, the emissary to Egypt, however, did not return to Medina. Rebels there had been issuing propaganda in favour of making Ali caliph. Ammar, who had been affiliated with Ali, abandoned Uthman for the Egyptian opposition. Abd Allah ibn Sa'd, the governor of Egypt, reported about the opposition's activities instead. He wanted to take action against Muhammad ibn Abi Bakr (Ali's foster son), Muhammad ibn Abi Hudhayfa (Uthman's adopted son), and Ammar ibn Yasir.

==== Uthman's attempts to appease the dissidents ====
In 655, Uthman directed those with any grievance against the administration, as well as the governors and "Amils" throughout the caliphate, to assemble at Mecca for the Hajj pilgrimage, promising that all legitimate grievances would be redressed. Accordingly, large delegations from various cities came to present their grievances before the gathering.

The rebels realized that the people in Mecca supported Uthman and were not inclined to listen to them. This represented a great psychological victory for Uthman. According to Sunni Muslim accounts, Uthman's cousin and the governor of Syria, Mu'awiya ibn Abi Sufyan, advised the caliph to come with him on his return to Syria, as the province was secure. Uthman rejected his offer, saying that he did not want to leave the city of Muhammad (viz., Medina). Mu'awiya then suggested that he be allowed to send a strong force from Syria to Medina to guard Uthman against any possible attempt by rebels to harm him. Uthman rejected it as well, stating that the presence of Syrian troops in Medina would be an incitement to civil war, and he could not be party to such a move.

== Revolt against Uthman ==
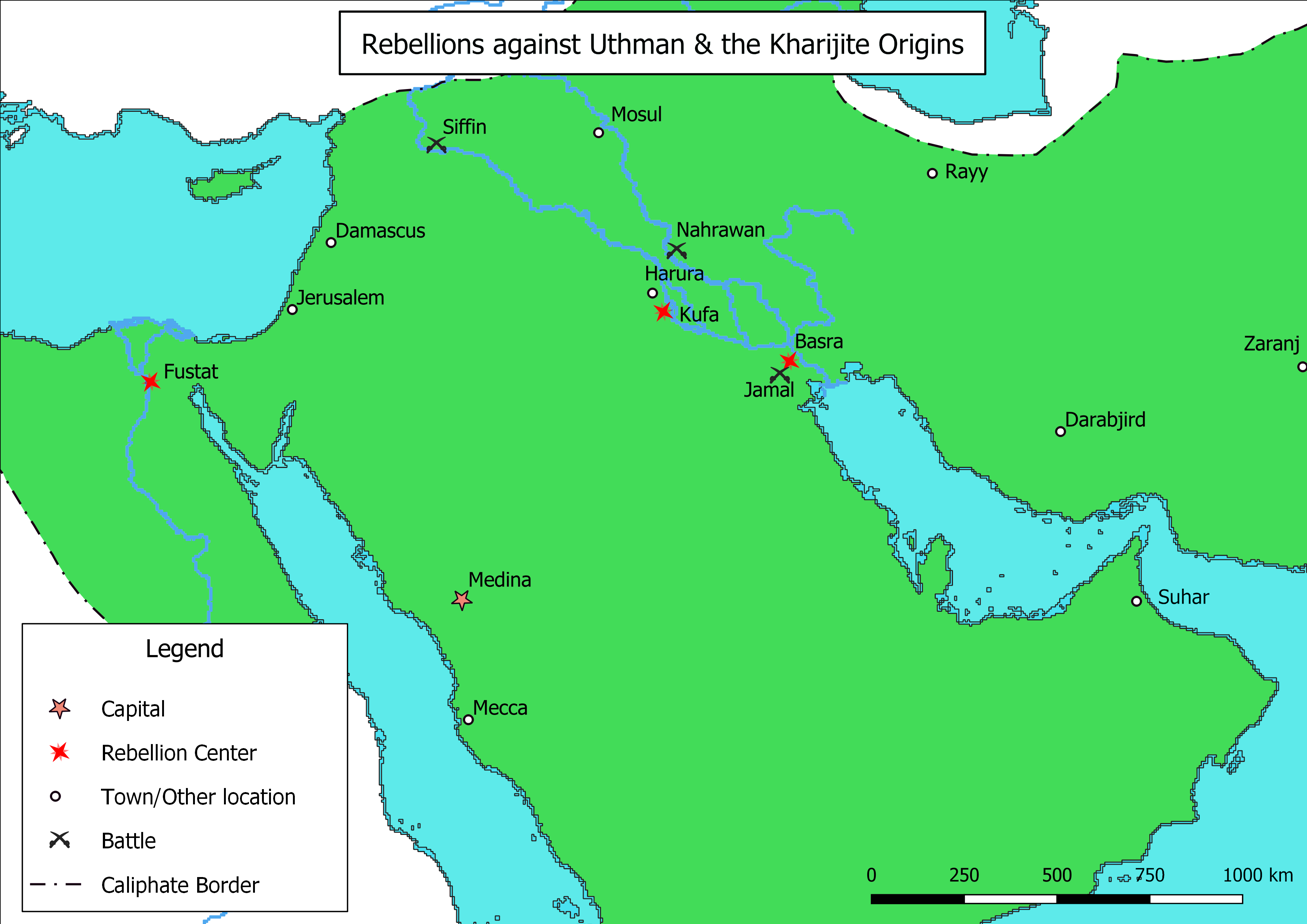
Rebellions against Uthman and Kharijite origins

The politics of Egypt played a major role in the propaganda war against the caliphate, so Uthman summoned Abd Allah ibn Sa'd, the governor of Egypt, to Medina to consult with him as to the course of action that should be adopted. Ibn Sa'd came to Medina, leaving the affairs of Egypt to his deputy, and in his absence, Muhammad ibn Abi Hudhayfa staged a coup d'état and took power. On hearing of the revolt in Egypt, Ibn Sa'd hastened back, but Uthman was not in a position to offer him any military assistance, and so Ibn Sa'd was unable to suppress the revolt.

=== Rebels in Medina ===
From Egypt, Kufa, and Basra, contingents of about 1,000 people apiece were sent to Medina, each with instructions to overthrow Uthman and his government. Representatives of the Egyptian contingent waited on Ali and offered him the caliphate, but he turned them down. Representatives of the contingent from Kufa waited on Zubayr, and those from Basra waited on Talha, each offering them their allegiance as the next Caliph, but both were similarly turned down. By proposing alternatives to Uthman as Caliph, the rebels swayed public opinion in Medina to the point where Uthman's faction could no longer offer a united front. Uthman had the active support of the Umayyads and a few other people in Medina.

=== Siege of Uthman's residence ===
The early stages of the siege of Uthman's house was not severe, but, as the days passed, the rebels intensified the pressure against Uthman. With the departure of the pilgrims from Medina to Mecca, the rebel position was strengthened further, and as a consequence the crisis deepened. The rebels understood that, after the Hajj pilgrimage, the Muslims gathered at Mecca might march to Medina and relieve Uthman. They therefore decided to take action against Uthman before the pilgrimage was over. During the siege, Uthman was asked by his supporters, who outnumbered the rebels, to let them fight, but Uthman refused in an effort to avoid bloodshed among Muslims. The gates of his house were shut and guarded by Abd Allah ibn al-Zubayr, along with Ali's sons, Hasan and Husayn.

=== Causes of anti-Uthman revolt ===
The actual reason for the anti-Uthman movement is disputed among the Shia and Sunnis. Under Uthman, the people became more prosperous, and they enjoyed a larger degree of political freedom. No institutions were devised to channel political activity, and, in their absence, the pre-Islamic tribal jealousies and rivalries, which had been suppressed under earlier caliphs, erupted once again. The people took advantage of Uthman's leniency, which became a headache for the state, culminating in Uthman's assassination.

According to Wilferd Madelung, during Uthman's reign, "grievances against his arbitrary acts were substantial by standards of his time. Historical sources mention a lengthy account of the wrongdoings he was accused of... It was only his violent death that came to absolve him in Sunni ideology from any ahdath and make him a martyr and the third Rightly Guided Caliph". According to Heather Keaney, Uthman, as a caliph, relied solely on his own volition in picking his cabinet, which led to decisions that bred resistance within the Muslim community. Indeed, his style of governance made Uthman one of the most controversial figures in Islamic history.

The resistance against Uthman arose because he favoured family members when choosing governors, reasoning that he would be able to exert more influence on their governance and, consequently, strengthen the feudal system he was working to establish. His instinct proved misguided, however, as his appointees ultimately exercised more control over how he conducted business than he had anticipated, and were even able to govern their provinces autocratically. Indeed, many anonymous letters were written to the leading companions of Muhammad, complaining about the alleged tyranny of Uthman's appointed governors. Moreover, letters were sent to the leaders of public opinion in different provinces concerning the reported abuse of power by Uthman's family. This contributed to unrest in the empire and finally Uthman had to investigate the matter in an attempt to ascertain the authenticity of the rumours. Madelung discredits the alleged role of Abd Allah ibn Saba in the rebellion against Uthman and observes that "few if any modern historians would accept Sayf's legend of Ibn Saba".

Bernard Lewis, a 20th-century scholar, says of Caliph Uthman:

Uthman, like Mu'awiya I, was a member of the leading Meccan family of Umayya and was indeed the sole representative of the Meccan patricians among the early companions of the Prophet with sufficient prestige to rank as a candidate. His election was at once their victory and their opportunity. That opportunity was not neglected. Uthman soon fell under the influence of the dominant Meccan families and one after another, the high posts of the Empire went to members of those families.

The weakness and nepotism of Uthman brought to a head the resentment which had for some time been stirring obscurely among the Arab warriors. The Muslim tradition attribute the breakdown which occurred during his reign to the personal defects of Uthman. But, the causes lie far deeper and the guilt of Uthman lay in his failure to recognize, control or remedy them.

== Assassination ==
On 17 June 656, after finding the gates of Uthman's house guarded, a group of rebels scaled the walls from a neighboring house and entered his room. Among them was Muhammad ibn Abi Bakr, the son of the first caliph, who reportedly seized Uthman by his beard. According to many accounts, after Uthman reminded him of his father's friendship, Ibn Abi Bakr felt remorse and withdrew from the scene; however, other rebels then moved in and fatally stabbed the Caliph while he was reciting the Quran. According to a narration, Uthman's wives threw themselves on his body to shield him. Na'ila bint al-Furafisa, one of his wives, extended her hand to block a blade. Her fingers were severed, and she was shoved aside. The following strike killed Uthman. A few of Uthman's slaves retaliated, and one of them succeeded in killing one of the assassins before being murdered by the rebels.

=== Funeral ===
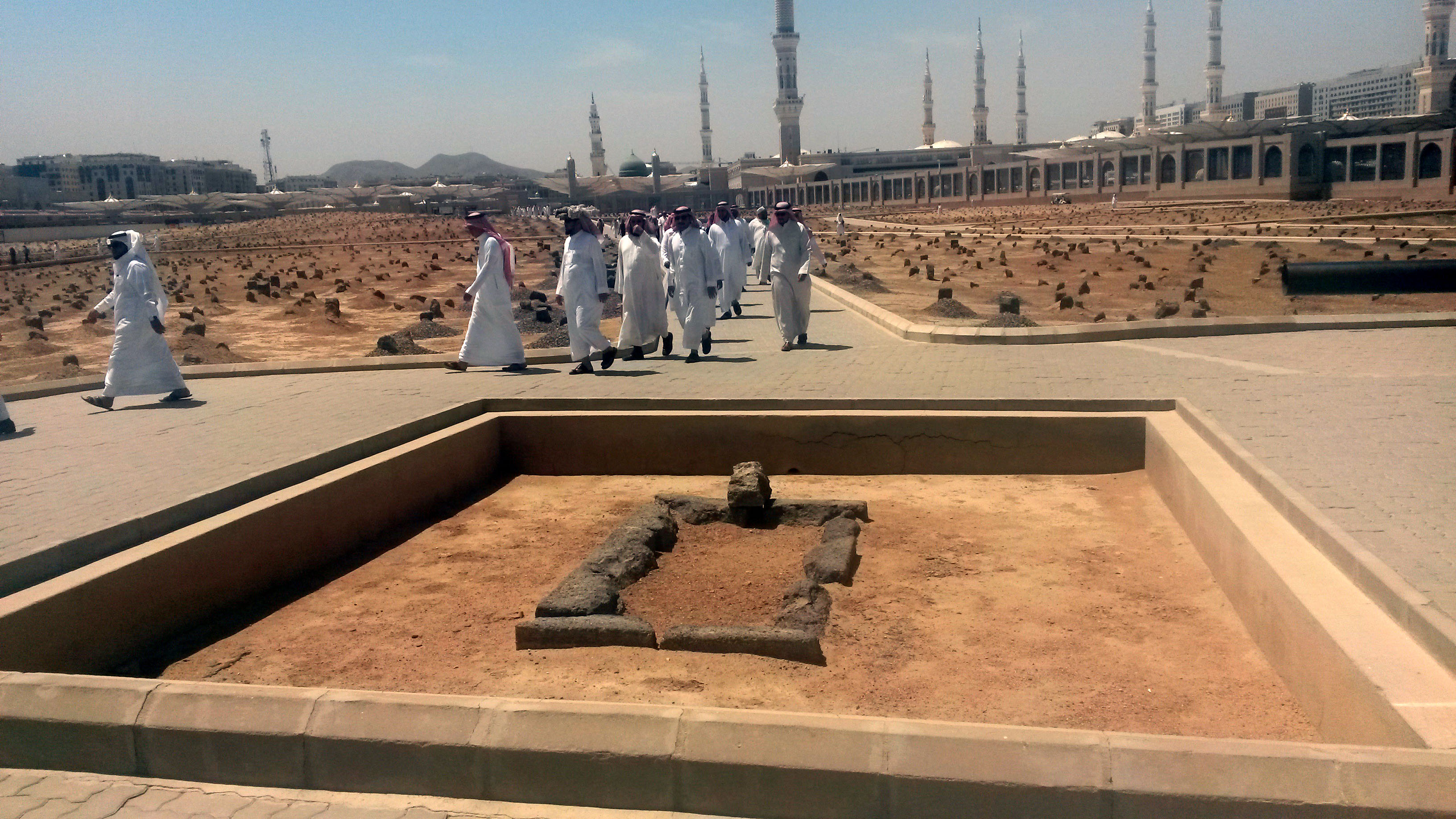
Uthman's tomb after its demolition

After Uthman's body had been in the house for three days, Na'ila approached some of his supporters to assist in his burial, but only about a dozen people responded, including Marwan, Zayd ibn Thabit, Huwatib ibn Alfarah, Jubayr ibn Mut'im, Abu Jahm bin Hudaifa, Hakim ibn Hazam and Niyar ibn Mukarram. The body was lifted at dusk, and because of the blockade, no coffin could be procured. It was not washed, and Uthman was carried to the graveyard in the clothes he was wearing when he was killed. Na'ila followed the funeral with a lamp, but in order to maintain secrecy, the lamp had to be extinguished. She was accompanied by some women, including Uthman's daughter Aisha.

=== Burial ===
The body was carried to Jannat al-Baqi for burial. Apparently, some people gathered there and resisted Uthman's burial in the Muslim cemetery. Accordingly, Uthman's supporters later buried him in the Jewish graveyard behind Al-Baqi Cemetery. Some decades later, the Umayyad rulers demolished the wall separating the two cemeteries and merged the Jewish cemetery into the Muslim one to ensure that his tomb was now inside a Muslim cemetery. The funeral prayers were led by Jubayr ibn Mut'im, and the dead body was lowered into the grave with little ceremony. After burial, Na'ila and Aisha wanted to speak but were discouraged from doing so due to possible danger from the rioters.

== Appearance and character ==
The historian al-Tabari notes that Uthman was of medium height, strong-boned and broad-shouldered and walked in a bowlegged manner. He is said to have had large limbs, with fleshy shins and long, hairy forearms. Though commonly described as having been very handsome with a fair complexion, when viewed up close, light scars from a childhood bout of smallpox were said to have been evident on his face. He had a full reddish-brown beard to which he applied saffron and thick curly hair which grew past his ears, though receded at the front. His teeth were bound with gold wire, with the front ones being noted as being particularly fine.

Unlike his predecessor Umar, Uthman was not a skilled orator, having grown tongue-tied during his first address as caliph. He remained somewhat apart from the other close Sahaba, having been an elegant, educated and cultured merchant-prince standing out among his poorer compatriots. This was a trait which had been acknowledged by Muhammad. One story relates that A'isha, having noted that Muhammad reclined comfortably and spoke casually with Abu Bakr and Umar, asked him why when he addressed Uthman, he chose to gather his clothing neatly and assume a formal manner. Muhammad replied that "Uthman is modest and shy and if l had been informal with him, he would not have said what he had come here to say".

Uthman was a family man who led a simple life even after becoming the caliph, despite the fact that his flourishing family business had made him rich. Prior caliphs had been paid for their services from the Bayt al-Mal, the public treasury, but the independently wealthy Uthman never took a salary. As a way of taking care of Muhammad's wives, he doubled their allowances. Uthman was not completely plain, however, he built a palace for himself in Medina, known as Al-Zawar, with a notable feature being doors of precious wood. Although Uthman paid for the palace with his own money, Shias considered it his first step towards ruling like a king.

According to al-Nuwayri, who lived in the 13th century, it was asked of Uthman why he did not drink wine during the Age of Ignorance, when there was no objection to this practice (before the revelation of Islam). He replied: "I saw that it made the intellect flee in its entirety, and I've never known of something to do this and then return in its entirety."

== Assessment and legacy ==
Uthman is said to have been the first caliph to adopt the title Khalifat Allah ("deputy of God") as well as Amin Allah ("trustee of God"). Sunni Muslim tradition considers him the third rightly-guided caliph, and Sunni historians regard Uthman's rule positively, particularly regarding his leniency. In their view, the kinsmen he appointed—such as Mu'awiya ibn Abi Sufyan and Abd Allah ibn Amir—proved effective in both military and political management. In contrast, Uthman has been accused by others of corruption, particularly in the case of al-Walid ibn Uqba.

One of Uthman's most significant acts was allowing Mu'awiya and Abd Allah ibn Sa'd, governors of Syria and Egypt respectively, to form the first Muslim navy in the Mediterranean Sea, rivalling the maritime dominance of the Byzantine Empire, and enabling the first Muslim conquest of Cyprus and Rhodes. Ibn Sa'd's conquest of the southeast coast of Spain, his stunning victory at the Battle of the Masts in Lycia, and naval expansion across the Mediterranean are generally overlooked. This subsequently paved the way for the establishment of several Muslim states in the Mediterranean Sea, which came in the form of the Emirate of Sicily and its minor vassal the Emirate of Bari, as well as the Emirate of Crete and the Aghlabid dynasty.

From an expansionist perspective, Uthman is regarded as skilled in conflict management, as is evident from how he dealt with the heated and troubled early Muslim conquered territories, such as Kufa and Basra, by directing the Arab settlers to new military campaigns and expansions. This not only resulted in settling the internal conflicts in those settlements but also further expanded the territory of the Caliphate to as far west as Mauretania and as far east as Sistan.

=== Religious impact ===
Uthman is credited with bringing unity to the current version of the Quran. Prior to Uthman's reign, the Quran did not formally exist as a fixed text but was largely written in fragmentary form and as a spoken, recited work. This brought disagreements over how the Quran would be recited. Although some Companions had attempted to organize collections of the Quran, it had not yet been standardized. Anas ibn Malik reported that Hudhayfa ibn al-Yaman noticed that Muslims differed in their reading of the Quran, so he said to Uthman, "O chief of the Believers! Save this nation before they differ about the Book". Uthman requested Hafsa bint Umar, a wife of Muhammad, to allow him to use as a reference the copy of the Quran in her possession, that was collected by Abu Bakr and Umar. He said, "Send us the manuscripts of the Qur'an so that we may compile the Qur'anic materials in perfect copies and return the manuscripts to you". Hafsa sent it to Uthman. Uthman then ordered Zayd ibn Thabit, Abd Allah ibn al-Zubayr, Sa'id ibn al-As and Abd al-Rahman ibn Harith to copy the manuscripts. This order from Uthman gave the final form of the Quran we have today, and although a few small variants do exist, most of the variant readings and recitations have been lost or destroyed.

=== Cultural depictions ===
Uthman has been portrayed in several productions. Uthman is prominently portrayed in the 2012 television series Omar, which depicts his role among Muhammad's companions and later follows his appointment as the third caliph. The series portrays the political developments of his reign and the events that led to his assassination in Medina. Uthman's life and caliphate have also been discussed in documentaries and historical programs dealing with the Rashidun caliphs and the early Muslim community.

== Bibliography ==
- Ahmed, Asad Q. (2011). The Religious Elite of the Early Islamic Ḥijāz: Five Prosopographical Case Studies. Oxford: University of Oxford Linacre College Unit for Prosopographical Research. ISBN 978-1-900934-13-8.
- Anthony, Sean W. (2013). "'Uthman b. 'Affan (ca. 579-656)". In Bowering, Gerhard; Crone, Patricia; Kadi, Wadad; Mirza, Mahan; Stewart, Devin J.; Zaman, Muhammad Qasim (eds.). The Princeton Encyclopedia of Islamic Political Thought. Princeton University Press. pp. 584–5.
- Della Vida, Giorgio Levi & Bosworth, C. E. (2000). "Umayya b. Abd Shams". In Bearman, P. J.; Bianquis, Th.; Bosworth, C. E.; van Donzel, E. & Heinrichs, W. P. (eds.). The Encyclopaedia of Islam, Second Edition. Volume X: T–U. Leiden: E. J. Brill. pp. 837–838. ISBN 978-90-04-11211-7.
- Humphreys, R. Stephen, ed. (1990). The History of al-Ṭabarī, Volume XV: The Crisis of the Early Caliphate: The Reign of ʿUthmān, A.D. 644–656/A.H. 24–35. SUNY Series in Near Eastern Studies. Albany, New York: State University of New York Press. ISBN 978-0-7914-0154-5.
- Keaney, Heather N. (2013). Medieval Islamic Historiography: Remembering Rebellion. New York and Abingdon, Oxon: Routledge. ISBN 978-0-415-82852-9.
- Keaney, Heather N. (2021). 'Uthman ibn 'Affan: Legend or Liability? (ebook ed.). London: Oneworld Academic. ISBN 978-1-78607-698-4.
- Madelung, W. (1997). The Succession to Muḥammad: A Study of the Early Caliphate. Cambridge University Press. ISBN 978-0-521-64696-3.
- Crone, Patricia; Hinds, Martin (1986). God's Caliph - Religious Authority in the First Centuries of Islam. Cambridge: Cambridge University Press. ISBN 0-521-32185-9.
- Bashier, Zakaria (2015). War and Peace in the Life of the Prophet Muhammad. Kube Publishing Ltd. ISBN 978-0-86-037626-2.
- al-Waqidi, Abu Abd Allah Muhammad ibn Umar (2011). The Life of Muhammad: Al-Waqidi's Kitab al-Maghazi. Translated by Rizwi Faizer. Routledge. ISBN 978-0415574341.
- Ramadan, Tariq (2007). In the Footsteps of the Prophet: Lessons from the Life of Muhammad. Oxford University Press. ISBN 978-0-19-537476-6.
- Lings, Martin (2006). Muhammad: His Life Based on the Earliest Sources. Rochester, Vt: Inner Traditions. ISBN 978-1-59477-153-8.
- Ibn Ishaq (2002). Ibn Ishaq's Sirat Rasul Allah - The Life of Muhammad Translated by A. Guillaume. Translated by A. Guillaume.
- Lewis, Archibald Ross; Runyan, Timothy J. (1990). European Naval and Maritime History, 300–1500. Indiana University Press. ISBN 9780253205735 – via Google Books.
- Kroll, Leonard Michael (16 March 2005). History of the Jihad - Islam Versus Civilisation. AuthorHouse. ISBN 9781463457303 – via Google Books.
- Gregory, Timothy E. (26 August 2011). A History of Byzantium. John Wiley & Sons. ISBN 9781444359978 – via Google Books.
- Weston, Mark (28 July 2008). Prophets and Princes - Saudi Arabia from Muhammad to the Present. John Wiley & Sons. ISBN 9780470182574 – via Google Books.
- Bradbury, Jim (1992). The Medieval Siege. Boydell & Brewer. ISBN 9780851153575 – via Google Books.
- Rogerson, Barnaby (2010). The Heirs Of The Prophet Muhammad - And The Roots Of The Sunni–Shia Schism. Little, Brown Book. ISBN 9780748124701.
- Madelung, Wilferd; Walker, Paul E., eds. (2021). Affirming the Imamate: Early Fatimid Teachings in the Islamic West. Bloomsbury Publishing. ISBN 978-0-7556-3733-1.
- Della Vida, G. Levi & Khoury, R.G. (2000). "ʿUt̲h̲mān b. ʿAffān". In Bearman, P. J.; Bianquis, Th.; Bosworth, C. E.; van Donzel, E. & Heinrichs, W. P. (eds.). The Encyclopaedia of Islam, Second Edition. Volume X: T–U. Leiden: E. J. Brill. p. 946–949. ISBN 978-90-04-11211-7.
- Abbas, Hassan (2021). The Prophet's Heir: The Life of Ali ibn Abi Talib. Yale University Press. ISBN 978-0-300-25205-7.

Uthman Banu Umayya Cadet branch of the Quraysh Born: c. 576 Died: 20 June 656
Sunni Islam titles
Preceded by Umar ibn al-Khattab	Caliph of Islam; Rashidun Caliph; 6 November 644 – 17 June 656	Succeeded by Ali ibn Abi Talib
