= Banu Kalb =

Former Arabian tribe

- Quda'a
- Nisba: Kalbī
- Location: The northern Hejaz, al-Jawf, Wadi Sirhan, the southern Syrian Desert, Palmyra, the Damascus area, Homs, the Golan Heights and the northern Jordan Valley
- Descended from: Kalb ibn Wabara
- Branches: Abdallah ibn Kinana; Janab; Zuhayr; Haritha; Ulaym; Adi; Ullays; Hisn ibn Damdam; Amir al-Akbar; Kinana ibn Awf; Awf ibn Kinana; Abd Wadd; Amir al-Aghdar; Wahballat; Taymallat
- Religion: Miaphysite Christianity (up to late 7th century); Islam (after 630s)

Map of the Arabian Peninsula in 600 AD, showing the various Arab tribes and their areas of settlement. The Lakhmids (yellow) formed an Arab monarchy as clients of the Sasanian Empire, while the Ghassanids (red) formed an Arab monarchy as clients of the Roman Empire.

The Banu Kalb (Arabic: بنو كلب, romanized: Banū Kalb) was an Arab tribe which mainly dwelt in the desert and steppe of northwestern Arabia and central Syria in the 5th—12th centuries CE.

It was involved in the tribal politics of the Byzantine Empire's eastern frontiers, possibly as early as the 4th century. By the 6th century, the Kalb had largely adopted Christianity and came under the authority of the Ghassanids, leaders of the Byzantines' Arab allies. During the lifetime of the Islamic prophet Muhammad, a few of his close companions were Kalbites, most prominently Zayd ibn Haritha and Dihya, but the bulk of the tribe remained Christian at the time of Muhammad's death in 632. They began converting in large numbers when the Muslims made significant progress in the conquest of Byzantine Syria, in which the Kalb stayed neutral. As a massive nomadic tribe with considerable military experience, the Kalb was sought as a key ally by the Muslim state. The leading clans of the Kalb forged marital ties with the Umayyad family, and the tribe became the military foundation of the Syria-based Umayyad Caliphate (661–750) from the reign of Mu'awiya I (r. 661–680) to the early reign of Abd al-Malik (r. 685–705).

During the Second Muslim Civil War, the Kalb routed its main rival, the Qays, in the Battle of Marj Rahit in 684, inaugurating a long-running blood feud, in which the Qays eventually gained the advantage. In the resulting tribal factionalism which came to dominate Umayyad politics, the Kalb became a leading component of the Yaman faction against the Qays. The Kalb lost its political influence under the pro-Qaysite caliph Marwan II (r. 744–750), a situation which continued under the Iraq-based Abbasid Caliphate (750–1258). From its footholds in the Ghouta and Palmyra oases, the tribe revolted against the Abbasids on several occasions in the 8th–10th centuries, at first in support of Umayyad claimants to the caliphate and later as key troops of the Qarmatians, whose suppression contributed to the Kalb's political isolation. The Kalb remained among the three largest tribes of Syria at the start of Fatimid rule in the late 10th century, but due to its increasing sedentarism, it was disadvantaged to the more numerous and nomadic Tayy and Kilab tribes. The Kalb's relative weakness encouraged its close alliance with the Fatimids over the next century. This was occasionally interrupted, most notably when the Kalb joined the Tayy and Kilab in a rebellion to split Syria among themselves in 1024–1025, during which the Kalb failed to capture Damascus. The Kalb continued transitioning to a settled existence into the 12th century, after which the tribe no longer appears in the historical record.

Before Islam, the Kalb dominated the regions of al-Jawf and Wadi Sirhan, as well as the Samawa, the great desert expanse between Syria and Iraq. After the Muslim conquest, the tribe expanded its presence into Syria proper, taking the dominant position in the Golan Heights, the northern Jordan Valley, the Damascus area, and in and around Homs and Palmyra. As Fatimid rule progressed in the 11th century, the tribe's main concentration between Damascus and Palmyra shifted to the settled areas between Damascus, the Hauran, and the Anti-Lebanon Mountains.

== Locations ==
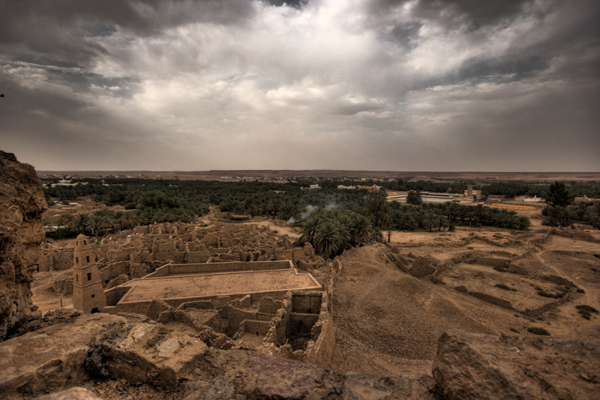
The Kalb's oldest-known dwelling areas were around Dumat al-Jandal in northwestern Arabia.

The Kalb was a Bedouin (nomadic) tribe well known for raising camels. Before the advent of Islam in the 7th century, the tribe's grazing grounds were in northwestern Arabia. Its earliest known abode, during the Byzantine era (4th–7th centuries CE), was in the al-Jawf depression, including the oasis of Dumat al-Jandal. The tribe was mainly concentrated in this region, bordering the eastern frontiers of the Byzantine Empire. They seasonally migrated from there deep into the vast desert steppe between Syria and Mesopotamia, which the Arabic sources called the Samawa or Samawat Kalb, after the tribe, especially the southwestern part of this region. To the west of al-Jawf, the tribe's Banu Amir al-Akbar branch roamed between the oasis of Tayma in the south to the wells of Quraqir in the northern Wadi Sirhan depression. The Kalb began to expand its grazing territories eastward toward the Euphrates River, following the retreat of the Taghlib tribe in c. 570. The Kalb's tribal territory was bordered on the north by the powerful Tayy tribe, close allies of the Kalb. To the west, southeast, and east were the tribes of Balqayn, Ghatafan, and Anaza, respectively.

The Kalb's domination of Wadi Sirhan and al-Jawf put its tribesmen in a good position to migrate northward into Syria. With the advent of Islam in the 630s, the Kalb began to enter Syria in large numbers, at first making their abodes in the Golan Heights, the northern Jordan Valley, and in and around Damascus. Its tribesmen eventually became major landowners in the Ghouta gardens surrounding Damascus, as well as living a semi-nomadic existence in the Marj pasture grounds on the outskirts of the Ghouta. They also established themselves in and around Homs and Palmyra. A minor proportion of the tribe settled down in the garrison town and administrative center of Kufa in Iraq during the same period, while many Kalbite tribesmen established themselves in Muslim Spain as part of the Syrian expeditionary forces sent there in the 8th century.

At the time of the mid-10th-century geographer Ibn Hawqal, the diyar (tribal territories) of the Kalb extended from the area of Siffin near Raqqa, off the western bank of the Euphrates, to Tayma. This expanse excluded the area of al-Rahba and largely bordered the southern Syrian and northern Hejazi diyar of the Fazara tribe, a branch of the Ghatafan. Because of its inclination toward sedentarism, through the 10th century, the Kalb gradually lost its dominant position in the Dumat al-Jandal and Wadi Sirhan regions to its Tayy allies, while those who remained nomadic either migrated to join their kinsmen in central Syria or kept a low profile in their traditional dwelling places. Military pressures also forced the Kalb to retreat from the Homs area in the mid-10th century, its territory thereafter becoming restricted to the environs of Palmyra and Damascus.

Nomadic sections of the Kalb continued to inhabit the desert east of Palmyra into the late 11th century. After that point, even these nomadic groups shifted to sedentarism and the Kalb's main area of concentration shifted from the stretch between Damascus and Palmyra southwestward to the settled areas between Damascus, the Anti-Lebanon Mountains, and the Hauran, especially the last region. Smaller groups of the Kalb moved north of Homs and the Nile Delta in Lower Egypt around this time.

== Genealogy ==
In the Arab genealogical tradition, the progenitor of the tribe was named Kalb, which means 'dog' in Arabic. Kalb's father was Wabara and his mother, Asma bint Duraym ibn al-Qayn ibn Ahwad of the Bahra', was known as Umm al-Asbu (lit. 'mother of wild animals') because all of her children were named after wild animals. (Note: The names of Wabara's and Umm al-Asbu's sons were as follows: Kalb ('dog'), Asad ('lion'), Fahd ('cheetah'), Namir ('leopard'), Dhi'b ('wolf'), Tha'lab ('fox'), Fahd ('lynx'), Dabu ('hyena'), Dubb ('bear'), Sid ('wolf') and Sirhan ('wolf').) The Kalb was part of the Quda'a tribal confederation, whose presence spanned the northern Hejaz through the northern Syrian steppe. The Kalb was the largest component in the northern half of the Quda'a's roaming areas. The origins of the Quda'a are obscure, with claims of Arab genealogists being contradictory. Some sources claimed that Quda'a was a son of Ma'add, thus making the tribe northern Arabians, or a descendant of Himyar, the semi-legendary patriarch of the southern Arabs.

With the exception of three small clans, all the branches of the Kalb descended from the line of Rufayda ibn Thawr ibn Kalb. The Kalb's most prominent branch was the Banu Abdallah ibn Kinana, especially its largest subbranch, the Banu Janab, which provided the Kalb with its chiefs. From the Janab descended the Kalb's aristocratic family of the 6th and 7th centuries, the Banu Haritha ibn Janab, as well as other prominent lines, namely the Banu Ulaym and the Banu Ullays. Among the other main branches of the Kalb was the Kinana ibn Awf. From its subbranch, the Banu Awf ibn Kinana, descended the Banu Abd Wadd and the Banu Amir al-Aghdar. The latter may have originally been a family of non-Kalbite priests for the pre-monotheistic Kalb's idol, Wadd, which was incorporated into the Kalb after the cult of Wadd spread to Dumat al-Jandal. The four prominent, 8th-century Kalbite scholars of Kufa, Muhammad ibn Sa'ib al-Kalbi, his son Hisham ibn al-Kalbi, al-Sharqi al-Qutami, and Awana ibn al-Hakam, all descended from the Banu Abd Wadd, and their works are the main sources for the Kalb's genealogy. Another major branch was the Banu Amir ibn Awf ibn Bakr, better known as the 'Banu Amir al-Akbar' to distinguish it from similarly named clans of the Kalb.

Abbreviated genealogical chart of the Kalb's prominent branches

Kalb
Thawr
Rufayda
B. Taymallat	Zaydallat	B. Wahballat
Udhra
Bakr	B. Kinana ibn Awf
B. Amir al-Akbar	B. Abdallah ibn Kinana	B. Awf ibn Kinana
B. Janab	B. Abd Wadd	B. Amir al-Aghdar
B. Zuhayr	B. Haritha	B. Adi	B. Ulaym
B. Hisn ibn Damdam	B. Ullays

Prominent subgroups of the Kalb

== Pre-Islamic era ==
=== Relations with the Byzantines ===
Kalbite tribesmen may have arrived in Syria by the 4th century, though precise information about the tribe at that time is unavailable. The historian Irfan Shahîd speculates Mawiyya, a warrior queen of Arab tribesmen in southern Syria, likely belonged to the Kalb. This would indicate that the Kalb was an ally of Mawiyya's principal force, the Tanukhids. The latter, like the Kalb, also traced their descent to the Quda'a tribal confederation.

The Kalb's territory on the Byzantine Empire's Limes Arabicus frontier straddled the Oriens, a collective term for the empire's eastern provinces. The Kalb may have been the unnamed tribe that launched a massive invasion of Byzantine-held Syria, Phoenicia, Palestine and Egypt in 410, according to Shahîd. He posits that the invasion was related to the fall of the Kalb's Tanukhid allies and the latter's replacement as the Byzantine's main foederati by the Salihids, who also descended from Quda'a. In the closing years of the 5th century, tensions between the Kalb and the Salihids culminated in a battle in which the Salihid phylarch, Dawud, was killed by Tha'laba ibn Amir of the Kalb and his ally Mu'awiya ibn Hujayr of the Namir, the Kalb's brother tribe, in the Golan. It is not clear if the conflict between Tha'laba ibn Amir and Dawud was a personal feud or part of a tribal conflict between the Kalb and the Salihids.

Although the Kalb's role in 5th-century Arab tribal politics in the Byzantine Empire is clear, contemporary sources do not indicate how early the Kalb made contact with the Byzantines. By the early 6th century, the Salihids were supplanted by the Ghassanids as the supreme phylarchs of the Arab tribes in Byzantine territory. Like the Ghassanids, the Kalb embraced Monophysite Christianity. The Kalb was put under the Ghassanids' authority and, like other allied tribes, was charged with guarding the Byzantines' eastern frontier against Sassanian Persia and the latter's Arab vassals in al-Hira, the Lakhmids. As a result of their firm incorporation in the Byzantine foederati system, the Kalb "became accustomed to military discipline and to law and order", according to the historian Johann Fück.

=== Activities in Arabia ===
There is scant record of the Kalb's activities in the so-called ayyam al-Arab literature, the collections of pre-Islamic poems which serve as a source of history for the tribes of pre-Islamic Arabia, especially the battles and raids they were involved in. An exception is the Day of Ura'ir, where a Kalbite chief, Masad ibn Hisn ibn Masad, was slain by the Banu Abs. The Kalbite historical tradition formulated in 9th-century Kufa mentions five pre-Islamic confrontations involving the Kalb. The three major ones were the Day of Nuhada, fought between the Abdallah ibn Kinana and Kinana ibn Awf divisions of the tribe around 570, the Day of Kahatin, and the Day of Siya'if between the Kalb and the Sasanian-allied Taghlib around the time of the Battle of Dhi Qar between the Sasanians and a coalition of Arab tribes. The two minor clashes were the Day of Ulaha against the Taghlib and the Day of Rahba against the Asad tribe.

The best-known pre-Islamic chief of the Kalb was Zuhayr ibn Janab, who wielded significant influence among the Bedouins of northern Arabia. On behalf of Abraha, the mid-6th-century Aksumite ruler of South Arabia, Zuhayr led an expedition against the north Arabian tribes of Taghlib and Bakr. In the mid-6th century, the Kalb under Zuhayr fought the Ghatafan tribe over the latter's construction of a haram (sacred place) at a place called 'Buss'; the Ghatafan's haram emulated the Ka'aba of Mecca, at the time a widely honored edifice containing pagan Arabian idols, which offended the powerful tribes of the area, including the Kalb. Zuhayr decisively defeated the Ghatafan and had their haram destroyed.

In the late 6th century, the Kalb under one of its chiefs, al-Harsha (al-Harith ibn Hisn ibn Damdam ibn Adi ibn Janab), conquered the Fadak oasis from its Jewish agriculturalists, whose influence had been waning at the time. Before then, Fadak had paid regular tribute to the Kalb. Among the captives taken in al-Harsha's assault was Salma, the daughter of Fadak's Jewish goldsmith Wa'il ibn Atiyya ibn Udays, who later became the wife of the Lakhmid king al-Mundhir IV and mother to his son al-Nu'man. She afterward married a Kalbite of the Banu Abd Wadd clan, Rumanis ibn Mu'aqqil, with whom she had their son Wabara. A descendant of Wabara's daughter Juwayriyya (and great-great-grandson of al-Harsha), the Christian Kalbite chief al-Furafisa ibn al-Ahwas, was the inheritor of Fadak's goldsmith.

== Islamic era ==
=== Interactions with Muhammad ===
Although the Ghassanids were the preeminent Arab tribal group of Byzantine Syria and presided over the Arab confederate tribes of Byzantium in the Syrian steppe throughout the 6th century, their influence began to wane in the 580s. They lost their powerful position and much of their prestige when the Sasanian Persians conquered Byzantine Syria in 613–614. The Byzantines recaptured the region in 628, but the Ghassanids remained weakened, divided into multiple subgroups, each headed by a different chief. The Kalb, though allied with the Ghassanids, had begun pushing into their territory within the Byzantine Empire's boundaries during the years of the Ghassanids' waning influence. From the days of the Islamic prophet Muhammad, in the 620s, the Muslims had attempted to ally with the Ghassanids, but without success. According to the historian Khalil Athamina, "the Muslims were therefore compelled to seek another ally in the area", the Kalb, "whose importance was rising".

A few individual Kalbite tribesmen in Mecca converted to Islam, including Zayd ibn Haritha and Dihya al-Kalbi, Muhammad's purported emissary to the Byzantine emperor, Heraclius. According to the historian Fred Donner, while there were notable converts among the Kalb, there are scarce details about contacts between Muhammad and the Kalb in general. As Byzantine foederati, the Kalb fought against Muslim advances in northern Arabia and Syria. The first confrontation was the 627/628 expedition against Dumat al-Jandal, in which the prominent companion of Muhammad, Abd al-Rahman ibn Awf, succeeded in converting the Christian chief of the Kalb there, al-Asbagh ibn Amr, to Islam. The pact between at least part of the Kalb, under al-Asbagh, and Muhammad was the first major step in the future alliance between the tribe and the Muslim state. The pact was sealed by the marriage of Abd al-Rahman to al-Asbagh's daughter, Tumadir, which represented the first marital link between the Kalb and the Quraysh, the tribe of Muhammad and Abd al-Rahman. (Note: Tumadir may have also married Caliph Uthman (r. 644–656), a member of the Quraysh's Umayyad family, for a short period. Through the progeny of her son, Abu Salama, marital and other familial connections were maintained with the Umayyads.)

Most of the Kalb probably remained Christian, despite the pact with al-Asbagh. Part of the tribe came under a Muslim agent, al-Asbagh's son Imru al-Qays, during the campaign against pro-Byzantine Arab tribes at Dhat al-Salasil in northwestern Arabia. After Zayd ibn Haritha was slain during a campaign against the Byzantines and their Arab allies at the Battle of Mu'ta in 629, Muhammad appointed Zayd's son, Usama, to head a retaliatory expedition to Syria, which did not launch until soon after Muhammad's death in 632. Usama may have been chosen for the campaign because of his Kalbite descent. The majority of the Kalb remained outside the emerging Muslim state's authority at the time of Muhammad's death. While al-Asbagh remained loyal to the Medina-based Muslim state during the subsequent Ridda wars, when most Arab tribes broke off their allegiance, another faction of the Kalb in Dumat al-Jandal, under the chief Wadi'a, rebelled, but was suppressed.

=== Neutrality in the Muslim conquest of Syria ===
The Ridda wars were largely concluded by 633 and the caliph (successor of Muhammad as leader of the Muslims) Abu Bakr launched the Muslim conquest of Byzantine Syria in late 633 or early 634. Despite their historical ties with Byzantium, Kalbite tribesmen remained largely neutral during the conquest. At least some Kalbites fought in the ranks of the Arab Christian tribes against Muslim forces led by Khalid ibn al-Walid at Ziza in Transjordan in 634. While Fück notes that individual Kalbite Muslims did not participate in the conquest, Athamina holds that "there are clear hints that one or more groups" of Kalbite tribesmen fought in the Muslim ranks from the initial phases of the invasion. A Kalbite, Alqama ibn Wa'il, was entrusted with distributing the spoils of the decisive Muslim victory against the Byzantines and their Ghassanid allies at the Battle of Yarmouk, a particularly high-stakes assignment due to the Muslim army's composition of diverse and competing groups of Arab tribes. The greater part of the Kalb did not participate in that battle, whether to avoid entanglement with either side or because of the distance of its territory from the battle site, in the northern Jordan Valley region. The conversion of much of the tribe to Islam probably occurred after this battle, which shattered the Byzantine army in Syria and drove on the Muslim conquest of the region.

The conquest was largely concluded by 638; by then, the Kalb dominated the steppes around Homs and Palmyra and was the leading and most powerful component of the Quda'a tribal confederation. In Athamina's opinion, the Muslim state's need to establish a defense network out of the militarily experienced, formerly Byzantine-allied Arab tribes of Syria drove it to strengthen ties with the Kalb, as well as with the old-established Judham and Lakhm tribes in the southern Syrian steppe. This need was pressing for the Muslims as they lacked a standing army and their tribal forces from Arabia had to be deployed to different fronts. In the mid-to-late 630s, Caliph Umar dismissed the Muslims' supreme commander in Syria, Khalid ibn al-Walid, and reassigned his forces, derived largely from the Mudar and Rabi'a tribal groups of Arabia, to the Sasanian front in Iraq. Athamina attributes this decision to the Kalb's probable opposition to the significant numbers of outside tribal soldiers and their families in Khalid's army, which the Kalb and its tribal neighbors deemed a threat to their socio-economic interests and power in Syria.

=== Peak of power under the Umayyads ===
==== Sufyanid period ====
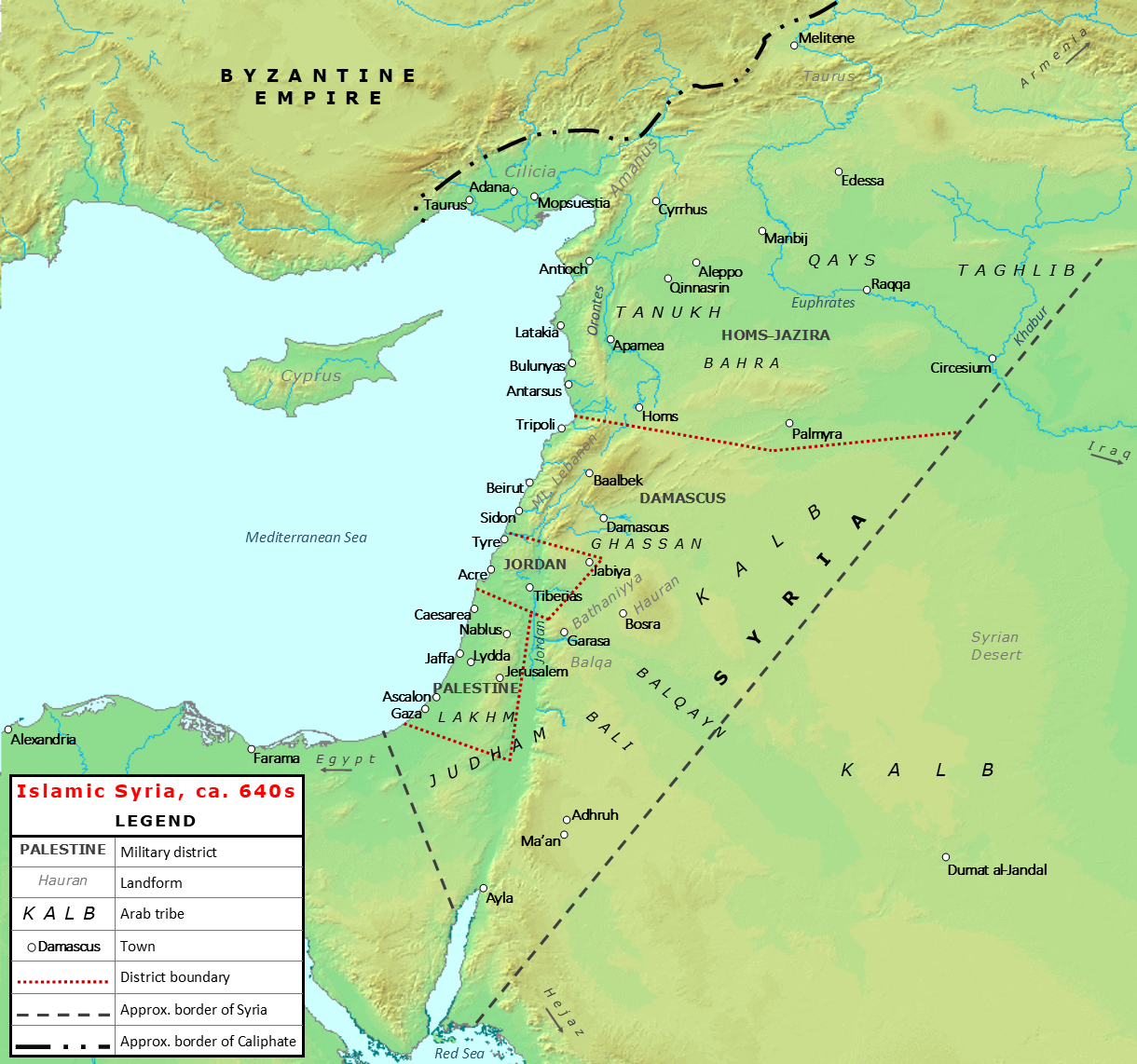
Map of Islamic Syria in the early 7th century, showing the dwelling areas of Arab tribes, including the Kalb

In 639, Umar appointed Mu'awiya ibn Abi Sufyan, a member of the powerful Umayyad clan of the Quraysh, to the governorships of the Damascus and Jordan districts, which collectively corresponded with central Syria. From the beginning of his administration, Mu'awiya forged close ties with the Kalb, one of the principal sources of military power in Syria. During the reign of his Umayyad kinsman, Caliph Uthman (r. 644–656), Mu'awiya's governorship was gradually expanded to include the rest of Syria. The Kalb formed marital links with the Umayyads from this time. Uthman married a Kalbite noblewoman, Na'ila bint al-Furafisa, a paternal cousin of Tumadir bint al-Asbagh. Na'ila's sister, Hind, was married to Uthman's Umayyad kinsman, the governor Sa'id ibn al-As. Mu'awiya married two Kalbite noblewomen, including Maysun, the daughter of Bahdal ibn Unayf, the Kalb's preeminent chieftain, who remained Christian until his death sometime before 657. The Kalb's marital ties with the Umayyads became a major source of their considerable political influence.

During the conflict between Mu'awiya and Caliph Ali (r. 656–661), the Kalb provided crucial support to Mu'awiya. Bahdal's sons and grandsons served as commanders against Ali's partisans during the 657 Battle of Siffin, which ended in a stalemate. Ali was killed in 661 and months later, Mu'awiya became caliph. He continued his reliance on the Kalb to maintain his foothold in Syria. Bahdal secured for the Kalb and its allies in the Quda'a significant privileges from Mu'awiya, including consultation in all major caliphal decisions, the right to propose and veto measures, and significant, annual hereditary stipends for 2,000 nobles of the Kalb and the Quda'a. With this, the Kalb became the most influential tribe during the Sufyanid period (661–684) of the Umayyad Caliphate. Mu'awiya was careful to keep the Kalb onside, ensuring that tribal newcomers to Syria from the Qays and Mudar groups did not settle in the Kalb's territories in the central and southern parts of the region, at least not in large numbers.

Mu'awiya's son and successor, Yazid I (r. 680–683), who was born to Maysun, also married a Kalbite woman, and maintained the privileges granted to the Quda'a by his father. Mu'awiya chose Yazid instead of his elder son by a woman of the Quraysh, an indication of the Kalb's critical role as the foundation of Sufyanid power. The accession of Yazid's son Mu'awiya II (r. 683–684), born to Yazid's Kalbite wife, was largely due to the machinations of Bahdal's grandson, Hassan ibn Malik ibn Bahdal, who was commonly known as 'Ibn Bahdal'.

==== Marwanid period ====
Mu'awiya II died weeks into his rule, leaving the caliphate in disarray. Ibn Bahdal favored electing one of Yazid's other, younger sons as successor, while the influential, ousted governor of Iraq, Ubayd Allah ibn Ziyad, favored an Umayyad from a different branch of the ruling family, Marwan ibn al-Hakam. The latter had forged links with the family of al-Asbagh by marrying his granddaughter, Layla bint Zabban, with whom he had his son Abd al-Aziz—the family of al-Asbagh represented the preeminent clan of the Kalb in northern Arabia, while that of Bahdal led the Kalb of the Syrian steppe. A third Umayyad contender for the succession was the son of Sa'id ibn al-As, Amr al-Ashdaq, who had also forged marital ties with a leading Kalbite family. According to the historian Andrew Marsham, the marriages between different families of the Umayyads and the Kalb "[reflected] competition both within Kalb and within the Umayyad kin-group". Amid the Umayyad succession crisis, a rival claimant to the caliphate, Ibn al-Zubayr of Mecca, had challenged Umayyad leadership and was gaining support in Syria. Ibn Bahdal, determined to preserve the political and economic privileges the Kalb had acquired under the Sufyanids, gave his allegiance to Marwan in return for the continuation of these privileges and priority in Marwan's court.

A former top aide of the Sufyanids, al-Dahhak ibn Qays al-Fihri, and the Kalb's main tribal rivals, the Qays, both supported Ibn al-Zubayr. Ibn Bahdal mobilized the Kalb and its tribal allies and routed al-Dahhak and the Qays at the Battle of Marj Rahit in August 684. (Note: The Kalbite poet al-Jawwas ibn Qa'tal boasted of his tribe's strength in that confrontation, comparing the mobilization of the Janab and Awf ibn Kinana branches as the coming together of "one mass of rocks".) In the battle's aftermath, the Qays–Kalb feud intensified, while Marwan became completely dependent on the Kalb and its allies to maintain his rule. Syrian tribes envious of the Quda'a's privileges either opposed or sought to join it. The Judham of Palestine and the South Arabian tribes which dwelt in the Homs district defected to the Quda'a's side after Marj Rahit, forming the Yaman coalition in opposition to the Qays. The Qays under Zufar ibn al-Harith al-Kilabi and the disaffected Umayyad commander Umayr ibn al-Hubab al-Sulami, who were based in the Jazira (Upper Mesopotamia), engaged the Kalb under Ibn Bahdal's brother, Humayd ibn Hurayth, in a series of raids and counter-raids (ayyam) during 686–689. The Kalb was frequently attacked by the Qays at its dwelling places in the Samawa and despite making retaliatory raids, the Kalbites were forced to leave the Samawa for the Jordan Valley. Humayd attacked the Qays in the Jazira around 690, but the Kalbites were dealt a heavy blow by the Qays at a place called Banat Qayn between 692 and 694, for which the caliph, Marwan's son Abd al-Malik (r. 685–705), had the culpable Qaysite chiefs executed by the Kalb in revenge. This event marked the last of the Qays–Kalb battles.

The Kalb remained the backbone of the Umayyad army through the early part of Abd al-Malik's reign. After Abd al-Malik's reconciliation with Zufar in 691, which the Kalb had protested, the Qaysites were reintegrated into the army, ending the Kalb's monopoly of power there and beginning a policy by the caliphs of balancing Qaysite and Kalbite/Yamanite interests. Moreover, Abd al-Malik lacked ancestral or marital ties with the Kalb, his wives being either Qurayshites or the daughters of Qaysite tribal chiefs. With the death, in 704, of Egypt's powerful governor Abd al-Aziz, who was slated to succeed his brother Abd al-Malik, Marsham notes that "the Kalb's close kinship connection with the caliphate was severed". (Note: The Kalb's familial ties to the caliphate were later restored for the relatively brief reign of Abd al-Aziz's son, Umar II (r. 717–720), whose grandmother, Layla bint Zabban, and wife, Umm Shu'ayb bint Shu'ayb ibn Zabban, were both Kalbites.) Nevertheless, several members of the tribe served key roles under Abd al-Malik and his successors. The most notable were Sufyan ibn al-Abrad, who led the suppression of revolts in Iraq in the 690s, the brothers Hanzala ibn Safwan and Bishr ibn Safwan, frequent governors of Ifriqiya and Egypt in the 720s–740s, al-Hakam ibn Awana, the governor of Sind in 731–740, Sa'id ibn al-Abrash, an adviser of Caliph Hisham (r. 724–743), Abu al-Khattar, the governor of Muslim Spain in 743–745, and Mansur ibn Jumhur, a major player in the intra-dynastic Third Muslim Civil War in 743–750.

The Kalb's position in the Umayyad state began to deteriorate under the pro-Qaysite caliph al-Walid II (r. 743–744), and collapsed under Caliph Marwan II (r. 744–750), who relied almost entirely on the Qays for military and administrative support at the expense of Yamanite interests. In June 745, the Kalbite chief of Palmyra, al-Asbagh ibn Dhu'ala, led a revolt against Marwan II in Homs, but the Kalb and its Yamanite allies were defeated. The Kalb afterward reconciled with the caliph by 746. However, with the advent of the Abbasid Revolution in 749–750, the Kalb probably realized Umayyad rule was close to collapse. Thus, when Marwan II dispatched 2,000 Kalbite soldiers to reinforce the Umayyad governor of Basra, they instead defected to the Abbasids.

Family links between the Kalb's princely house, the Banu Janab, and the Umayyads

Janab
B. Haritha	B. Adi
B. Hisn ibn Damdam
Adi	al-Harith (al-Harsha)
Qunafa	Tha'laba
Dalja	Amr
Unayf	Al-Ahwas (Note: Al-Ahwas ibn Amr ibn Tha'laba was a chief of the Banu Janab and led the Kalb in the clashes of Yawm Kahatin and Yawm Siya'if, both occurring around the first decade of the 7th century.)	Al-Asbagh
Bahdal	Al-Furafisa	Imru al-Qays	Zabban	Tumadir
Hurayth	Malik	Maysun	Mu'awiya I (r. 661–680)	Na'ila	Uthman (r. 644–656)	Layla	Marwan I (r. 684–685)
Humayd	Hassan	Sa'id	Yazid I (r. 680–683)	Kalbite woman	Abd al-Aziz
Mu'awiya II (r. 683–684)	Granddaughter of Zabban	Umar II (r. 717–720)

Caliphs from the Umayyad family
Vertical dashed lines denote skipped generations
Horizontal dashed lines denote marriages
Citations and footnotes provided only for persons not mentioned in the article

=== Revolts against the Abbasids ===
The Kalb's role in Syria declined under the Iraq-based Abbasids. The Yaman, including the Kalb, quickly became frustrated with Abbasid rule in Syria and joined the revolt of the Umayyad prince Abu Muhammad al-Sufyani and the Qaysite general Abu al-Ward in 750–751. Abu Muhammad was a descendant of the Kalb's former patron, Mu'awiya I, and he presented himself as a messianic figure known as the 'Sufyani', who many from Homs believed would restore the Umayyad Caliphate. Abu al-Ward was killed by an Abbasid army while Abu Muhammad and the Kalb barricaded themselves in Palmyra, after which the revolt dissipated.

The Kalb-led Yamanites were the chief backers of another Umayyad claimant to the caliphate, Abu al-Umaytir al-Sufyani, who took power in Damascus in 811, amid the Great Abbasid Civil War. Due to partisan acts in favor of the Yaman, the Qays tribes opposed Abu al-Umaytir. The Qaysite leader, Ibn Bayhas al-Kilabi, backed another Umayyad counter-caliph, Maslama ibn Ya'qub, and together defeated Abu al-Umaytir. By 813, Ibn Bayhas reverted to Abbasid allegiance, prompting the two Umayyad claimants to the caliphate to take refuge with the Kalb in its Ghouta villages of Mezzeh, Darayya and Beit Lihya until their natural deaths.

In the 860s, Abbasid central control waned in the provinces, including Syria. In 864, the Kalb under Utayf ibn Ni'ma took leadership of an anti-Abbasid revolt in Homs in which the city's governor, al-Fadl ibn Qarin, was killed. The Kalb was afterward defeated by the Abbasid general Musa ibn Bugha, but soon linked up with a rebel Tanukhid chief in northern Syria, Yusuf ibn Ibrahim al-Fusays. In 866, Utayf refused to recognize the new Abbasid caliph and was captured and executed by the general Ahmad ibn al-Muwallad, but the Kalb of the Homs countryside continued to resist. Al-Fusays abandoned his alliance with the Kalb and assaulted the tribe. Although the Abbasids reconciled with al-Fusays, the fate of the Kalbite tribes of the Homs countryside is not known. The tribe later allied with Isa ibn al-Shaykh al-Shaybani, the Arab strongman of Palestine in c. 866–871.

==== Alliance with the Qarmatians ====
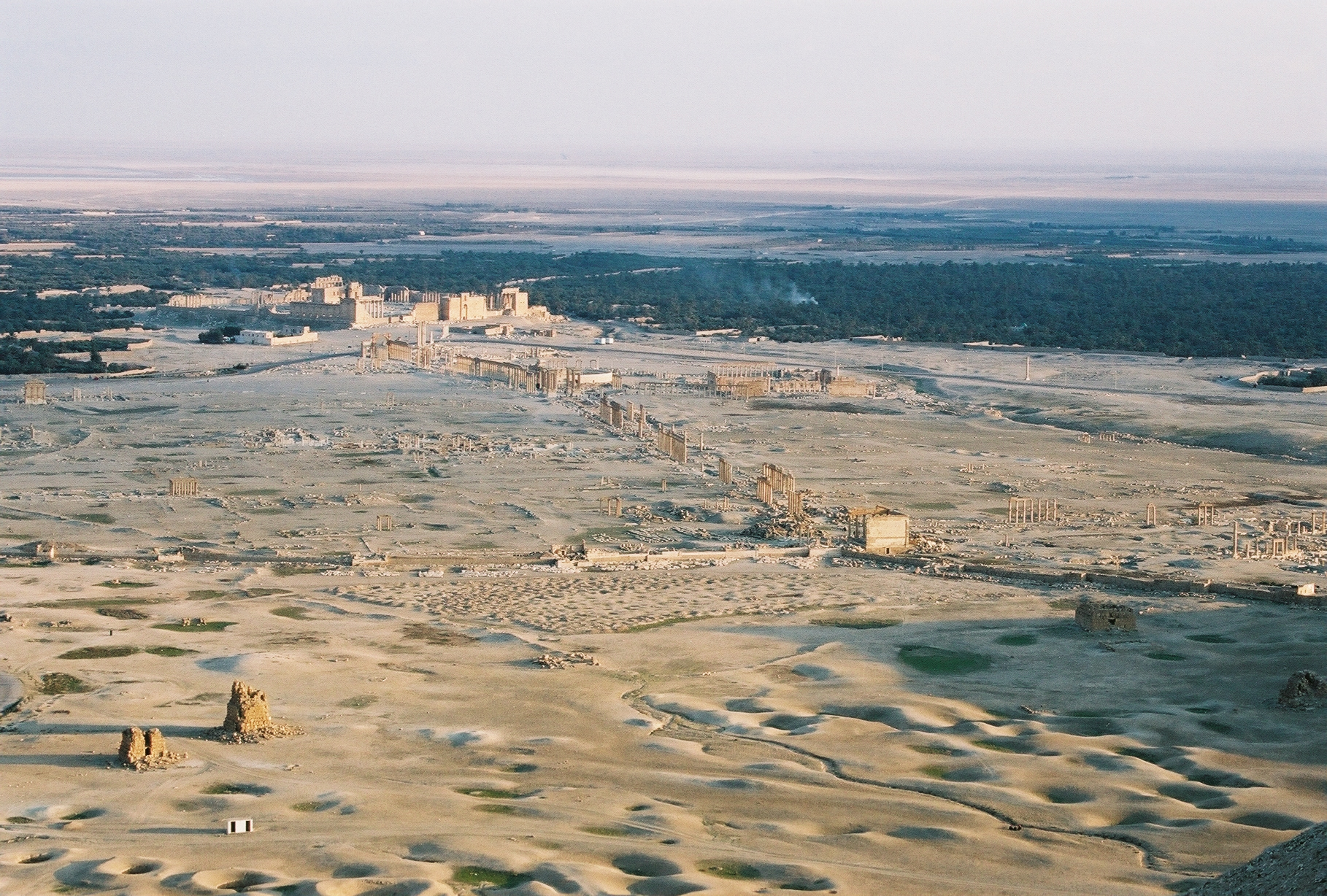
Ruins of Palmyra, a principal base of the Kalb between the mid-7th and mid-11th centuries

In the 10th century, the Kalb was one of the three largest Arab confederations of Syria, largely concentrated in the central parts of the region; the other two confederations were the Tayy in southern Syria and the Kilab in northern Syria. Unlike the Tayy and Kilab, who were relative newcomers, most of the long-established Kalb tribesmen were settled peasants who lost their traditional nomadic mobility by this time. At this point, the Kalb economically depended on tolls exacted from the caravans travelling between al-Rahba and Homs and Damascus, as well as taxes on the agricultural output from the Palmyra oasis and the Anti-Lebanon Mountains.

Nomadic clans of the Kalb which controlled Palmyra and the Samawa found a strong patron in the Qarmatian movement, and became propagandists of this millenarian Isma'ili Shi'a sect. The Qarmatians under their leader Zakarawayh had failed to gain traction among the Bedouin tribes around Kufa but the Banu Ullays and some of the Banu al-Asbagh branches of the Kalb embraced Zakarawayh's son, al-Husayn, in 902. Later that year, the Kalbite converts under al-Husayn's brother, Yahya, defeated and killed the Abbasid garrison commander of Rusafa, Sabuk al-Daylami, then stormed the city, looting it and burning its mosque. The Kalb under Yahya proceeded toward Damascus, sacking the villages along the way, before launching an abortive, seven-month siege on the city. The besiegers were dispersed and Yahya was killed by an army sent by the Tulunids, who ruled Egypt, nominally on behalf of the Abbasids. The Kalb then escaped Damascus with al-Husayn. The latter's Kalb-dominated army, led by the da'i and chief al-Nu'man of the Ullays, was devastated by the forces of the Abbasid caliph al-Muktafi (r. 902–908) at the Battle of Hama in November 903.

Attempts by the Qarmatian leaders to rouse the defeated chiefs of the Ullays were rejected and they submitted to the Abbasids at al-Rahba in 904. Nevertheless, within a short period, the Ullays reverted to the Qarmatian cause and suffered a damaging campaign by the Abbasids. Another deputy of Zakarawayh, Abu Ghanim, appealed to the Kalb of Palmyra. While most of the Kalbites were opposed to the Qarmatian mission, Abu Ghanim won over remnants of the Ullays, many among the al-Asbagh, and brigands from other Kalb clans, such as the Banu Ziyad. In 906, they plundered Bosra, Adhri'at and Tiberias, and killed the deputy governor of the Jordan district. In response, al-Muktafi dispatched a punitive expedition led by Husayn ibn Hamdan against the Kalb, but the Kalb and the Asad defeated Ibn Hamdan, forcing him to flee to Aleppo. Later that year, Ibn Hamdan defeated the Kalb and its Tayy allies. The Kalb then raided places in the Samawa and attacked Hit. Al-Muktafi countered with an army led by Muhammad ibn Ishaq ibn Kundaj, which compelled the Kalb to betray the Qarmatians and kill Nasr, thereby avoiding punitive action by the authorities. "The final retreat of the [Qarmatians]" from Syria after their defeat in 907, left the Kalb "politically isolated", according to the historian Kamal Salibi.

=== Relations with the Hamdanids ===
In 944–945, the Hamdanid emir Sayf al-Dawla established an emirate in Aleppo spanning much of northern Syria, with the southern parts controlled by the Egypt-based Ikshidids. In his attempt to capture Damascus from its Ikhshidid governor in 947, he rallied the Kalb and other Bedouin tribes, but was defeated. The Kalb also participated in at least one of Sayf al-Dawla's campaigns against the Byzantines. At times, Sayf al-Dawla campaigned to protect the Kalb of Homs and at other times confronted them to reassert his authority in his domains, a situation which played out with the other Arab tribes. These tribes launched a massive uprising against him in 955, which he decisively suppressed, forcing the Kalb to abandon Homs. In 958, the Kalb and the Tayy launched an assault against the Hamdanid governor of Homs, Abu Wa'il Taghlib ibn Dawud.

=== Relations with the Fatimids ===
The Kalb had been considerably weakened during the 10th century as a result of the tribe's increasing sedentarism, its lack of control over urban settlements from which Bedouin tribes typically exacted tribute, its highly decentralized structure, and the defeat of the Qarmatians. When the Isma'ili Fatimid Caliphate under the general Ja'far ibn Falah invaded Syria in 970, the emir of the Kalb's Palmyra-based Banu Adi clan, Ibn Ulayyan, captured the pro-Abbasid chief of the Damascus ahdath (urban militia) during his attempted escape to Palmyra. The Kalbite emir sent him to Ja'far for a large bounty, thereby inaugurating a century-long, mostly collaborative relationship between the Kalb and the Fatimids. Its numbers and power reduced from its historical highs in previous centuries and possessing a respect for order, the Kalb became among the first tribes to ally with the Fatimids and the tribe most often employed by the Fatimids in Syria.

Ibn Ulayyan's brother, Sinan ibn Ulayyan, was emir of the Kalb by 992, when he participated in the struggle between the rival Fatimid military factions of the Turks under Manjutakin and the Berbers under al-Hasan ibn Ammar, the latter himself a scion of a ruling Kalbite family in Sicily. Throughout the 11th century, the Kalb was commissioned by the Fatimids on several occasions against the Mirdasid-led Kilab of northern Syria. As Fatimid control weakened in Syria after Caliph al-Hakim's disappearance in 1021, Sinan and the chiefs of the Kalb's traditional ally, the Tayy under the Jarrahid emir Hassan ibn al-Mufarrij, and its traditional rivals, the Kilab under the Mirdasid emir Salih ibn Mirdas, formed an unprecedented Bedouin alliance to divide Syria among themselves. The three chiefs launched their war in 1025, taking over much of Syria. Bianquis speculates severe economic strain on the Kalb, probably emanating from years-long drought and reduced crop yields in the Anti-Lebanon and the Palmyrene steppe, high grain prices, and low caravan traffic had pushed the Kalb to rupture its relations with the Fatimids. However, while the Tayy and Kilab took control of Palestine and northern Syria, respectively, the Kalb failed to capture Damascus. Sinan's death in 1028 and the defection of his successor, Rafi ibn Abi'l-Layl, to the Fatimids scuttled the alliance, which unraveled with Salih's slaying by Rafi's warriors in the Fatimid army at the Battle of al-Uqhuwana in 1029.

By 1031, Rafi, having grown dissatisfied at the failure of the Fatimids to transfer Sinan's iqtas to him, resumed the Kalb's alliance with Hassan and the Tayy, who had been driven into the Palmyrene steppe by the Fatimids. Both the Kalb and the Tayy then relocated to Byzantine territory near Antioch after allying with Byzantium in the aftermath of the Mirdasids' victory over the Byzantines at the Battle of Azaz. Nevertheless, by 1038, Rafi and the Kalb renewed their allegiance to the Fatimids, playing a key role in the army of Anushtakin al-Dizbari, the Fatimid governor of Syria, during his successful campaign against the Mirdasid emir of Aleppo, Shibl al-Dawla Nasr, near Homs. After Anushtakin's death and the return of Mirdasid rule to Aleppo in 1042, the Kalb participated in the abortive Fatimid campaigns against the Mirdasid emir Mu'izz al-Dawla Thimal in 1048 and 1050. The Kalb again were dispatched by the Fatimids against the Mirdasids in 1060, this time at al-Rahba.

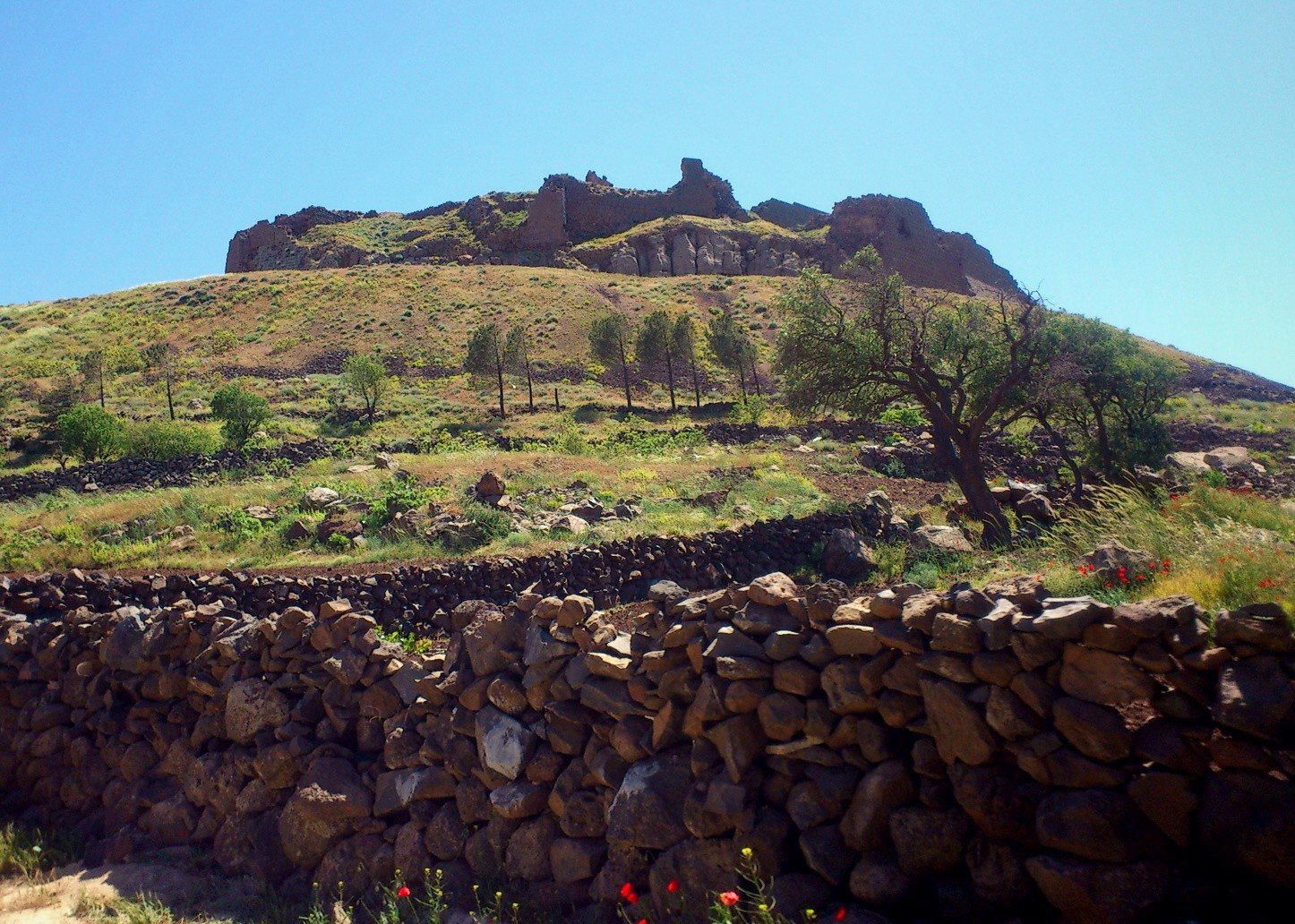
A Kalbite emir was the original founder of the fortress of Salkhad in the Hauran.

In 1065, the Kalb entered a conflict against the Fatimid governor of Damascus, Badr al-Jamali, and bested the Fatimid troops dispatched against it, killing and capturing several soldiers and commanders. Among the captives was the dignitary Ibn Manzu, who agreed to pay a substantial ransom and became a key client of the Kalb in Damascus. During the revolt of the Damascenes against the Fatimid garrison loyal to Badr in 1068, Ibn Manzu arranged for the Kalb, by that time led by Sinan's son Mismar and Hazim ibn Nabhan al-Qarmati, to back the Damascenes. The Kalb was unable to breach the city's defenses, but remained outside its walls. The Fatimid troops gained the advantage and Mismar negotiated a large bribe for his neutrality, though this was not paid and the Fatimids used the respite to defeat the Damascenes, prompting the Kalb to withdraw into the Ghouta. According to the historian Werner Caskel, this event represents the last known military engagement of the Kalb. Mismar's son, Husayn, founded or rebuilt the fortress of Salkhad in the Hauran in 1073, for which he is credited by an inscription.

=== Last appearances under the Seljuks ===
After the mid-11th century, the resurgent power of the Bedouin tribes of Syria and Iraq dissipated, precipitated by the invasion of the Turkish Seljuk Empire and its affiliates. With the exception of the Tayy under the Jarrahids' descendant branches and the Mazyadids of al-Hilla, the Bedouin tribes disappear from the political map of the region by the end of the 11th century. From then on, various tribes receive occasional mention in the record as allies of the Turkish atabegs or as raiders of caravans. In 1084, the Kalb, including its Banu Ulaym branch, joined the Bedouin coalition assembled by the Uqaylid ruler of Aleppo, Muslim ibn Quraysh, to strengthen his position against his Seljuk overlords; he was slain two years later and Aleppo came under direct Turkish rule.

The Kalb continued its shift to sedentarism into the 12th century, especially in the Hauran. The Kalb there are recorded in 1131 as having captured the Mazyadid emir Dubays ibn Sadaqa on his way to Salkhad. The Kalb then transferred Dubays to the custody of the Turkish atabeg of Damascus, Taj al-Mulk Buri. A Kalbite family from the Kinana branch, the Banu Munqidh, which had established an emirate in the Orontes Valley in the 1020s, continued to operate under the suzerainty of Syria's Turkish atabegs until its demise in 1157. (Note: Two modern tribes which claim descent from the Kalb are the Sirhan and the Shararat. The former had migrated from the Hauran and took control of the Wadi Sirhan, which is called after the tribe, around 1650. By the early 18th century, the Sirhan was driven out by the powerful Anaza tribes, relocating to the Balqa, in Transjordan. The Sirhan joined a tribal alliance, the Ahl al-Shimal ('the People of the North'), to counter the Anaza. The Shararat also became part of this alliance. In its oral traditions, the Shararat long claimed 'noble' descent from the Kalb, and its leaders hold that the tribe represents the last remnant of the Kalb. Modern researchers are divided on the claim, with some denying the Kalbite lineage and others supporting it. At the dawn of Saudi rule in the 1920s, the Shararat, though weak and subordinate to larger tribes, controlled the 400 kilometers (250 mi)-expanse between Kaf and Dumat al-Jandal. Probably as a result of its weakness against other tribes, it enthusiastically supported the Saudis and continues to be regarded as a 'loyalist' tribe in the country.)

== Bibliography ==
- Ahmed, Asad Q. (2011). The Religious Elite of the Early Islamic Ḥijāz: Five Prosopographical Case Studies. University of Oxford Linacre College Unit for Prosopographical Research. ISBN 978-1-900934-13-8.
- Athamina, Khalil (1994). "The Appointment and Dismissal of Khālid b. al-Walīd from the Supreme Command: A Study of the Political Strategy of the Early Muslim Caliphs in Syria". Arabica. 41 (2): 253–272. doi:10.1163/157005894X00191. JSTOR 4057449.
- Bianquis, Thierry (1993). "Mirdās, Banū or Mirdāsids". In Bosworth, C. E.; van Donzel, E.; Heinrichs, W. P. & Pellat, Ch. (eds.). The Encyclopaedia of Islam, Second Edition. Volume VII: Mif–Naz. Leiden: E. J. Brill. pp. 115–123. ISBN 978-90-04-09419-2.
- Bianquis, Thierry (1986). Damas et la Syrie sous la domination fatimide (359-468/969-1076): essai d'interprétation de chroniques arabes médiévales. Tome premier (in French). Damascus: Institut français de Damas. ISBN 978-2-35159-130-7.
- Bianquis, Thierry (1989). Damas et la Syrie sous la domination fatimide (359-468/969-1076): essai d'interprétation de chroniques arabes médiévales. Deuxième tome (in French). Damascus: Institut français de Damas. ISBN 978-2-35159-131-4.
- Bianquis, Thierry (1997). "Sayf al-Dawla". In Bosworth, C. E.; van Donzel, E.; Heinrichs, W. P. & Lecomte, G. (eds.). The Encyclopaedia of Islam, Second Edition. Volume IX: San–Sze. Leiden: E. J. Brill. pp. 103–110. ISBN 978-90-04-10422-8.
- Blankinship, Khalid Yahya, ed. (1993). The History of al-Ṭabarī, Volume XI: The Challenge to the Empires. SUNY Series in Near Eastern Studies. Albany, New York: State University of New York Press. ISBN 978-0-7914-0851-3.
- Bosworth, C. E., ed. (1999). The History of al-Ṭabarī, Volume V: The Sāsānids, the Byzantines, the Lakhmids, and Yemen. SUNY Series in Near Eastern Studies. Albany, New York: State University of New York Press. ISBN 978-0-7914-4355-2.
- Caskel, Werner (1966a). Ğamharat an-nasab: Das genealogische Werk des His̆ām ibn Muḥammad al-Kalbī, Volume I (in German). Leiden: Brill. OCLC 490272940.
- Caskel, Werner (1966b). Ğamharat an-nasab: Das genealogische Werk des His̆ām ibn Muḥammad al-Kalbī, Volume II (in German). Leiden: Brill. OCLC 490272940.
- Chatty, Dawn (2018). Nomadic Societies in the Middle East and North Africa: Entering the 21st Century. Leiden and Boston: Brill. ISBN 978-90-04-14792-8.
- Cobb, Paul M. (2001). White Banners: Contention in 'Abbasid Syria, 750-880. Albany: State University of New York Press. ISBN 978-0-7914-4880-9.
- Crone, Patricia (1994). "Were the Qays and Yemen of the Umayyad Period Political Parties?". Der Islam. 71 (1). Walter de Gruyter and Co.: 1–57. doi:10.1515/islm.1994.71.1.1. ISSN 0021-1818. S2CID 154370527.
- Demichelis, Marco (2021). Violence in Early Islam: Religious Narratives, the Arab Conquests and the Canonization of Jihad. London, New York and Dublin: I. B. Tauris. ISBN 978-0-7556-3799-7.
- Dixon, 'Abd al-Ameer (1971). The Umayyad Caliphate, 65–86/684–705: (A Political Study). London: Luzac. ISBN 978-0-7189-0149-3.
- Dixon, A. A. (1978). "Kalb b. Wabara—Islamic Period". In van Donzel, E.; Lewis, B.; Pellat, Ch. & Bosworth, C. E. (eds.). The Encyclopaedia of Islam, Second Edition. Volume IV: Iran–Kha. Leiden: E. J. Brill. pp. 493–494. ISBN 978-90-04-05745-6. OCLC 758278456.
- Donner, Fred McGraw (1981). The Early Islamic Conquests. Princeton: Princeton University Press. ISBN 978-1-4008-4787-7.
- Fück, J. W. (1978). "Kalb b. Wabara–Pre-Islamic Period". In van Donzel, E.; Lewis, B.; Pellat, Ch. & Bosworth, C. E. (eds.). The Encyclopaedia of Islam, Second Edition. Volume IV: Iran–Kha. Leiden: E. J. Brill. p. 492. ISBN 978-90-04-05745-6. OCLC 758278456.
- Hiyari, Mustafa A. (1975). "The Origins and Development of the Amīrate of the Arabs during the Seventh/Thirteenth and Eighth/Fourteenth Centuries". Bulletin of the School of Oriental and African Studies. 38 (3): 509–524. doi:10.1017/s0041977x00048060. JSTOR 613705. S2CID 178868071.
- Kennedy, Hugh N. (2004). The Prophet and the Age of the Caliphates: The Islamic Near East from the 6th to the 11th Century (Second ed.). Harlow: Pearson Education Limited. ISBN 0-582-40525-4.
- Halm, Heinz (1996). The Empire of the Mahdi: The Rise of the Fatimids. Leiden: Brill. ISBN 90-04-10056-3.
- Hawting, Gerald R. (2002). "Yazīd (I) b. Muʿāwiya". In Bearman, P. J.; Bianquis, Th.; Bosworth, C. E.; van Donzel, E. & Heinrichs, W. P. (eds.). The Encyclopaedia of Islam, Second Edition. Volume XI: W–Z. Leiden: E. J. Brill. pp. 309–311. ISBN 978-90-04-12756-2.
- Hinds, Martin (1993). "Muʿāwiya I b. Abī Sufyān". In Bosworth, C. E.; van Donzel, E.; Heinrichs, W. P. & Pellat, Ch. (eds.). The Encyclopaedia of Islam, Second Edition. Volume VII: Mif–Naz. Leiden: E. J. Brill. pp. 263–268. ISBN 978-90-04-09419-2.
- Humphreys, R. Stephen (1993). "Munkidh". In Bosworth, C. E.; van Donzel, E.; Heinrichs, W. P. & Pellat, Ch. (eds.). The Encyclopaedia of Islam, Second Edition. Volume VII: Mif–Naz. Leiden: E. J. Brill. pp. 577–580. ISBN 978-90-04-09419-2.
- Ibn al-Athir (2006). The Chronicle of Ibn al-Athīr for the Crusading Period from al-Kāmil fīʼl-Taʼrīkh, Part 1. Translated by D. S. Richards. Aldershot and Burlington: Ashgate. ISBN 978-0-7546-4077-6.
- Ingham, Bruce (2009). "The Dialect of the Euphrates Bedouin, a Fringe Mesopotamian Dialect". In Al-Wer, Enam; De Jong, Rudolf (eds.). Arabic Dialectology: In honour of Clive Holes on the Occasion of his Sixtieth Birthday. Leiden and Boston: Brill. pp. 99–108. ISBN 978-90-04-172128.
- Kaegi, Walter E. (2002). "Yarmūk". In Bearman, P. J.; Bianquis, Th.; Bosworth, C. E.; van Donzel, E. & Heinrichs, W. P. (eds.). The Encyclopaedia of Islam, Second Edition. Volume XI: W–Z. Leiden: E. J. Brill. pp. 289–292. ISBN 978-90-04-12756-2.
- Kister, M. J. (1986b). "Mecca and the Tribes of Arabia: Some Notes on Their Relations". In Sharon, M. (ed.). Studies in Islamic history and civilization in honour of Professor David Ayalon. Cana and Leiden: Brill. pp. 33–57.
- Kister, M. J. (2016) [1990]. "On the Wife of the Goldsmith of Fadak and her Progeny: A Study in Jāhilī Geneaological Traditions". Society and Religion from Jahiliyya to Islam (Reprint ed.). Abingdon, Oxon and New York: Routledge. pp. 321–330. ISBN 9780860782773.
- Kister, M. J. (1986). "Kuḍāʿa". In Bosworth, C. E.; van Donzel, E.; Lewis, B. & Pellat, Ch. (eds.). The Encyclopaedia of Islam, Second Edition. Volume V: Khe–Mahi. Leiden: E. J. Brill. pp. 315–318. ISBN 978-90-04-07819-2.
- Lammens, Henri (1960). "Baḥdal". In Gibb, H. A. R.; Kramers, J. H.; Lévi-Provençal, E.; Schacht, J.; Lewis, B. & Pellat, Ch. (eds.). The Encyclopaedia of Islam, Second Edition. Volume I: A–B. Leiden: E. J. Brill. pp. 919–920. OCLC 495469456.
- Madelung, Wilferd (2000). "Abūʾl-Amayṭar al-Sufyānī". Jerusalem Studies in Arabic and Islam. 24: 327–341.
- Marsham, Andrew (2013). "The Architecture of Allegiance in Early Islamic Late Antiquity: The Accession of Mu'awiya in Jerusalem, ca. 661 CE". In Beihammer, Alexander; Constantinou, Stavroula; Parani, Maria (eds.). Court Ceremonies and Rituals of Power in Byzantium and the Medieval Mediterranean. Leiden and Boston: Brill. pp. 87–114. ISBN 978-90-04-25686-6.
- Marsham, Andrew (2022). "Kinship, Dynasty, and the Umayyads". The Historian of Islam at Work: Essays in Honor of Hugh N. Kennedy. Leiden: Brill. pp. 12–45. ISBN 978-90-04-52523-8.
- Munt, Harry (2014). The Holy City of Medina: Sacred Space in Early Islamic Arabia. New York: Cambridge University Press. ISBN 978-1-1070-4213-1.
- Patai, Raphael (1969) [1962]. Golden River to Golden Road: Society, Culture, and Change in the Middle East (Third, Enlarged ed.). Philadelphia: University of Pennsylvania Press. ISBN 978-0-8122-7289-5.
- Salibi, Kamal S. (1977). Syria Under Islam: Empire on Trial, 634–1097, Volume 1. Delmar: Caravan Books. ISBN 978-0-88206-013-2.
- Shahid, Irfan (1986). Byzantium and the Arabs in the Fourth Century. Washington, D. C.: Dumbarton Oaks Research Library and Collection. ISBN 0-88402-116-5.
- Sudayri, Abd al-Rahman ibn Ahmad ibn Muhammad (1995). The Desert Frontier of Arabia: Al-Jawf Through the Ages. London: Stacey International. ISBN 978-0-9057-4386-8.
- Williams, John Alden, ed. (1985). The History of al-Ṭabarī, Volume XXVII: The ʿAbbāsid Revolution, A.D. 743–750/A.H. 126–132. SUNY Series in Near Eastern Studies. Albany, New York: State University of New York Press. ISBN 978-0-87395-884-4.
- Vaglieri, L. V. (1965). "Dūmat al-Djandal". In Lewis, B.; Pellat, Ch. & Schacht, J. (eds.). The Encyclopaedia of Islam, Second Edition. Volume II: C–G. Leiden: E. J. Brill. p. 624–626. OCLC 495469475.
- Zakkar, Suhayl (1971). The Emirate of Aleppo: 1004–1094. Beirut: Dar al-Amanah. OCLC 759803726.
