= Salihids =

Tribal Arab confederation in pre-islamic Syria

Salihids سليح
- 4th century CE–6th century CE
- Status: Tribal confederation, Foederati of the Byzantine Empire
- Religion: Christianity
- Government: Phylarchy
- History
  - Established: 4th century CE
  - Disestablished: 6th century CE
Preceded by	Succeeded by
Tanukhids	Ghassanids
- Today part of: Syria; Jordan; Saudi Arabia

The Salīḥids (Arabic: بنو سليح, romanized: Banū Salīḥ), also known simply as Salīḥ or by their royal house, the Zokomids (Arabic: Ḍajaʿima) were the dominant Arab foederati of the Byzantine Empire in the 5th century. They succeeded the Tanukhids, who were dominant in the 4th century, and were in turn defeated and replaced by the Ghassanids in the early 6th century.

The Salihids were originally concentrated in the Wadi Sirhan and Balqa regions of modern Jordan, but spread as far as northern Syria after entering the service of the Byzantine Empire. The Salihids were charged with collecting tax from Bedouins dwelling within the Limes Arabicus (Byzantine frontier with the Syrian and Arabian deserts) and protecting the frontier from Bedouin raiders. They were ardent Christians and at least one of their phylarchs and kings, Dawud, built a Christian monastery, Deir Dawud.

== Sources ==
The Salihid period is far more obscure than the preceding Tanukhid period (4th century) and the later Ghassanid period (6th century) due to a scarcity of available sources. The sole Greek source that mentioned the tribe, namely its royal Zokomid household, was Sozomen (d. c. 450 CE); the latter has been described as "valuable for writing the history of the Arab foederati in both the fourth and fifth centuries", according to modern historian Irfan Shahîd.

Arabic sources describing the Salihids are likewise scant, with the exception of the medieval Arab historian Hisham ibn al-Kalbi (d. 819), who provided some of the tribe's history in his genealogical work of the Arab tribes, the Jamharat al-Nasab. Unlike his documentation of other tribes, Ibn al-Kalbi did not receive his information directly from Salihids, because few if any remained in his lifetime; instead, most of his informants were members of other tribes had historically interacted with the Salihids, namely the Ghassanids, the Kalb and Kinda. The paucity of source material available to Ibn al-Kalbi may also be linked to the Christian faith and settled existence of the Salihids. Another Greek source, the 6th-century Theophanes of Byzantium, who mentions the rise of the Ghassanids, gives further credence to Ibn al-Kalbi's work. The historian Werner Caskel notes that while Ibn al-Kalbi's account contains several fabrications and invented members, his record of the Salihids' premier family, the Daja'ima (Zokomids) is largely credible.

Most other references to the Salihids in Arabic sources derive from Hisham's work. For the fall of the Salihids, the al-Muḥabbar, written by Hisham's pupil Ibn Habib, is considered the most important source, while the Tarikh of Ya'qubi is considered "most valuable for its onomastic and toponymic precision", determining "the period of Salih's fall" and "the terms of the foedus" between the Salihids' Ghassanid successors and the Byzantines. The works of the 10th-century historian Hamza al-Isfahani also contribute details to the reconstruction of the Salihids' fall.

== Genealogy ==
The genealogy of the Salihids is highly obscure. According to Shahid, it is generally accepted that they stemmed from the Quda'a tribal group. Several of the tribes which constituted the Quda'a had been settled in the Oriens (Byzantine Syria) and northern Arabia since antiquity. Caskel holds that the Salihids considerably predated the Quda'a and only became members of that tribal confederation during the Umayyad period (661–750) (see below). In Arabic sources, the Salihids refer to the tribe, while the Daja'ima refers to the tribe's royal household during Byzantine rule. The Jamharat gives the Salihids' genealogy as: Salīḥ ibn Ḥulwān ibn ʿImran ibn al-Ḥafī ibn Quḍāʿa. The actual name of the tribe's eponymous progenitor Salīḥ, according to the Jamharat, was ʿAmr. The founder of the Zokomid (Ḍajaʿima) household was Ḍuʿjum ibn Saʾd ibn Salīḥ.

== History ==
=== Origins ===
According to the traditional Arabic sources, before their entry into the Oriens, the Salihids had been established in northern Arabia. The 8th-century historian Umar ibn Shabba reported that as early as the 3rd century, the Salihids had allied with the Palmyrene Empire and were settled by the latter in the manāẓir al-Shām (watchtowers of the Limes Arabicus, the Byzantine–Arabian frontier) between the Balqa (central Transjordan) and Huwwarin. Most sources point to an original migration from Wadi Sirhan, a valley whose northern end opened into the Byzantine province of Arabia Petraea. This valley was also home to the Salihids' Quda'a kinsmen, the Banu Kalb, making it more plausible that the Salihids entered Oriens from Wadi Sirhan.

The Salihids' first settlements in the Limes Arabicus and their main power base were likely in the provinces of Arabia, Palaestina Salutaris and Phoenice Libanensis, all situated in the southern Levant. According to Shahid, this was the natural area where a tribe entering Byzantine territory from Wadi Sirhan would settle; moreover, this was the region where the foederati were most needed by the Byzantines in the 5th century as the peace with the Sasanian Empire left only the Arabian Peninsula as the most likely source for hostile forces to the empire.

=== Rise ===
The precise period in which the Salihids, or more specifically, their Zokomid ruling house, dominated the Arab foederati of the Byzantine Empire is not certain. According to historian Warwick Ball, the Salihids became Byzantium's chief Arab ally by the end of the 4th century following the decline of the Tanukhids, whose power and favor deteriorated particularly as a result of a failed revolt in 383. It is apparent that their heyday was between the reigns of emperors Arcadius (395–408) and Anastasius (489–518). The founder of the Zokomid household, Zokomos, known in Arabic as Ḥamāṭa and nicknamed Ḍujʿum (the mighty) was already a powerful tribal figure before his service with Byzantium. Sozomen indicated that Zokomos became a phylarch under the Byzantines and converted to Christianity along with "all his subjects" after "a certain monk of great celebrity" prophesied the birth of his son on condition of embracing the Christian faith.

Zokomos bore two sons, Amr and Awf. The former may have been the aforementioned prophesied son because his name signifies a good omen. This son founded the less important branch of the Zokomid household and Shahid speculates Amr was the founder of the monastery of Dayr Amr to the north of Jerusalem, which is currently a Christian locality known by the same name. Amr was the father of Mundhir, of whom nothing is known but his name. Awf had a son named Amr, who fathered Habāla, Habūla (possibly the same person) and Ḥawthara. Nothing is known about Awf's son and grandsons. The offspring of Mundhir and Amr ibn Awf's grandsons have been documented to varying extents. They were the last generation of Zokomid/Salihid phylarchs. Habala/Habula's son Dawud was the best-known Salihid phylarch and king, largely due to the short biography of him in the Jamharat. The latter says of Dawud the following:

And he was a king who used to engage in raiding expeditions. Then he became a Christian, repented, loathed the shedding of blood, and followed the religious life. He built a monastery and used to carry the water and the mortar on his back, saying 'I do not want anyone to help me,' and so his clothes became wet, and he was nicknamed al-Lathiq, 'the bedraggled.' When he became averse to bloodshedding and killing, his position weakened and he became himself the target of raids until he was killed by Thaʿlaba ibn ʿĀmir al-Akbar and Muʿawiya ibn Ḥujayr. — Jamharat al-Nasab by Hisham ibn al-Kalbi

According to Shahid, the Jamharat's statement that Dawud converted to Christianity "must be a mistake" since the Zokomids had already been Christians since the time of Zokomos around 400 CE, but Dawud's newfound piety "is correct and cannot be viewed with suspicion". Dawud's name, which is Arabic for "David", is unique among the Salihids and their Tanukhid and Ghassanid predecessors and successors, in that it was biblical and not Arabic. This indicated that Dawud or his father were evidently attached to biblical tradition or the Israelite king David in particular. Dawud was the builder of a monastery bearing his name, Dayr Dawud, in northern Syria, between Resafa and Ithriya. Before becoming the Salihid king and phylarch, Dawud was considered a jarrār (commander of one thousand [warriors]) or chiliarch, according to Hisham's pupil Ibn Habib.

As indicated in the Jamharat and in a poetic verse composed by Dawud's anonymous daughter, Dawud was slain by Tha'laba ibn Amir and Mu'awiya ibn Hujayr, the respective chiefs of the brother tribes of Banu Kalb and Banu Namir ibn Wabara. According to Shahid, it is clear that Dawud's killers were from allied tribes seeking to weaken the dominant Salihids. From Dawud's daughter's verse, it is apparent that the battle took place between al-Qurnatayn (modern al-Shaykh Saad) in the Hauran and Mount Harib in the Golan Heights. Dawud's death, without recorded progeny, was a major contributor to the Salihids' ultimate downfall. Furthermore, Emperor Leo I the Thracian's incorporation of a large Salihid contingent in his expedition against the Vandals in North Africa significantly weakened Salihid power as the contingent was annihilated in battle.

Dawud's cousin or brother, Ziyad, may have succeeded Dawud as phylarch when the latter took up a religious life or died. He too was a jarrar, according to Ibn Habib, and participated in the battle of al-Baradān, which most likely took place at a spring in the vast Samawah (the desert between Syria and southern Iraq). After an initial Salhid success, the battle turned in favor of the opposing Kinda tribe led by Akil al-Murar Hujr, and Ziyad was slain. Shahid asserts it was not Akil al-Murar Hujr, who apparently died in the early or mid-5th century, but his great-grandson Hujr ibn Harith, who is said by the Byzantine sources to have attacked the Limes Arabicus, and presumably the Salihid guardians of that frontier, in c. 500.

=== Fall to the Ghassanids ===
Another Zokomid, Sabīṭ ibn al-Mundhir, served as a jābī (tax collector), charged with collecting taxes from the Arab tribes in Oriens on behalf of the Byzantine authorities. He may have been delegated this authority by Dawud. This was significant, according to Shahid, because it sheds light on the "functions of the Arab phylarchs of Byzantium: they not only fought but also collected taxes for the empire from their fellow Arabs". Sabit was slain by the deaf, one-eyed Ghassanid chief, Jidʿ ibn ʿAmr, when Sabit attempted to collect the tax from the Ghassanids. This ignited the Salihid–Ghassanid war that ended in a Ghassanid victory and their subsequent supremacy over the Arab federate tribes of Byzantium. The Ghassanids had crossed the Limes Arabicus around 490 and were obliged to pay tribute to the Salihid guardians of the Limes. The terms of the Ghassanids' tribute was, according to Ibn Habib, one dinar, a dinar and a half, and two dinars, for each Ghassanid tribesman, depending on their status.

The killings of Dawud, Ziyad and Sabit, the Salihids' decreased strength after the 468 Vandalic campaign, and the assaults by the powerful Kindites and Ghassanids of Arabia toward the end of the 5th century, all led to the Salihids' weakened state by 502, when the Ghassanids formally became the dominant Arab federates of Byzantium. Afterward, the Salihids continued to operate, but were demoted. Between 502 and 529, they constituted one of many Arab foederati and directly answered to the dux (governor) of their province or the magister militum per Orientem (commander of the field army of Oriens). This period of time may have been the floruit of Ḥārith ibn Mandala, the last Zokomid phylarch, according to the Jamharat's genealogical table of the Salihids. According to Ibn Durayd, the Tayyid poet Amir ibn Juwayn declared in a verse that Harith ibn Mandala went on a raiding expedition (presumably on behalf of the Byzantines) against an Arab tribe, possibly the Banu Asad, and never returned.

When the Ghassanids under their king Jabala ibn al-Ḥarith were made the supreme phylarchs over all the Arab federate tribes, the Salihids became their subordinates, though tensions and clashes persisted between them. In 580, relations between the Ghassanids and Byzantines became considerably fraught, and authority over the Arab federate tribes was again decentralized. The Salihids may have become independent of the Ghassanids as a result, and one of their phylarchs participated in the Byzantine siege of Mardin in 586.

=== Remnants in the Islamic era ===
Nothing further is heard of the Salihids until the Muslim conquest of the Levant in the 630s when they fought alongside other Arab Christian federate tribes against the Muslim Arabs. At Dumat al-Jandal in northern Arabia, a Byzantine army composed of the Salihids, Kalb, Tanukhids and Ghassanids, was defeated by the Muslim commander Iyad ibn Ghanm. Later, this same Arab Christian coalition, boosted by the Lakhmids and the Judham, was defeated by the Muslim general Khalid ibn al-Walid at Ziza in the Balqa. The Salihids appear again with the Tanukhids in 638, this time in the ḥādir (military encampment) at Qinnasrin; at that time, the Muslim general Abu Ubayda ibn al-Jarrah asked the members of the ḥādir to convert to Islam, but the Orthodox Christian Salihids refused.

The Salihids likely dispersed throughout Islamic Syria and Iraq and their clans may have joined other tribes. During early Umayyad rule, the Kalb-led Quda'a confederation maintained a privileged position in government and during the Second Muslim Civil War (680–692) entered a long-running feud with its chief tribal rival, the Qays of northern Syria. It was during this period, Caskel asserts, that the Salihids joined the Quda'a. Their membership was likely due to their need for support on the one hand and the Kalb's efforts to strengthen the Quda'a to counter the Qays; the same situation applied with the northern Syrian Tanukhids, which joined the Quda'a around the same time.

Only one Salihid, Usāma ibn Zayd al-Salīḥī, attained prominence during the Islamic era. He served under the Umayyad caliphs al-Walid I (r. 705–715) and Sulayman (r. 715–717) as the overseer of the kharaj (land tax) in Egypt and under caliphs Yazid II (r. 720–724) and Hisham (r. 724–743) as their kātib (scribe). Otherwise, the Salihids' staunch Christianity rendered them isolated in the Islamic era, unlike the Tanukhids and Ghassanids, whose members and clans continued to flourish.

According to Abbasid-era geographers, members of the Salih were found living near Kufa in southern Iraq alongside their Tayyid allies, and near Latakia in northern Syria. Al-Bakri, who preserved Ibn Shabba's accounts on the Salihids, reported that the Salihids' descendants still inhabited al-Balqa and Huwwarin at the time Ibn Shabba wrote his work in 876.

=== Modern era ===
In modern-day Jordan (al-Balqa), the ancient Salihi presence is attested to various places: the village of al-Salīḥī about 20 kilometers (12 mi) northwest of Amman, the ʿAyn al-Salīḥī spring and the Wādī al-Salīḥī valley. Moreover, in the vicinity of these places lives the al-Salīḥāt (colloquially: Sleiḥat) tribe; Shahid asserts that the latter are "almost certainly, because of the rarity of the name, the descendants of the ancient Salīḥids".

== Bibliography ==
- Ball, Warwick (2016). Rome in the East: The Transformation of an Empire (2nd ed.). Routledge. ISBN 978-1-317-29635-5.
- Caskel, Werner (1966). Ğamharat an-nasab: Das genealogische Werk des His̆ām ibn Muḥammad al-Kalbī, Volume II (in German). Leiden: Brill. OCLC 490272940.
- Shahid, Irfan (1989). Byzantium and the Arabs in the Fifth Century. Washington, D.C.: Dumbarton Oaks Research Library and Collection. ISBN 0-88402-152-1.
- Shahid, Irfan (1995). "Salīḥ". In Bosworth, C. E.; van Donzel, E.; Heinrichs, W. P. & Lecomte, G. (eds.). The Encyclopaedia of Islam, Second Edition. Volume VIII: Ned–Sam. Leiden: E. J. Brill. pp. 981–982. ISBN 978-90-04-09834-3.
