= Zuhayr ibn Janab =

Chieftain of the Banu Kalb tribe and a pre-Islamic Arabic warrior poet

- Born: Early 6th century Arabia
- Died: Arabia
- Occupations: Poet, chieftain

Zuhayr ibn Janab ibn Hubal al-Kalbi (Arabic: زهير بن جناب بن هبل الكلبي) was a chieftain of the Banu Kalb tribe and a pre-Islamic Arabic warrior poet. Much of his biography relies on semi-legendary accounts, but it is apparent that he lived in the early 6th century. He led the Kalb and the wider Quda'a tribal confederation. During his one-time alliance with the Aksumite viceroy Abraha, Zuhayr quelled a revolt by the Taghlib and Bakr tribes, capturing their chieftains, including Kulayb ibn Rabi'a. Later, he destroyed the pagan sanctuary of the Ghatafan tribe, which rivaled the Kaaba in Mecca. Traditional Arab sources noted that Zuhayr lived an extremely long life, and finally died by suicide after he was disobeyed.

== Life ==
Zuhayr's genealogy, as cited by Ibn Abd Rabbih, is Zuhayr ibn Janāb ibn Hubal ibn ʿAbd Allāh ibn Kināna. He belonged to the Banu Kalb tribe, and served as one of the group's main chieftains. According to some ancient or medieval Arab sources, Zuhayr was also the leader of the entire Quda'a confederation, which included the Bedouin tribes of Kalb, Juhayna, Bali, al-Qayn, Bahra' and Tanukh. Under Zuhayr's leadership, the Kalb also formed a close alliance with the Amilah tribe. Zuhayr is recorded as one of the muʿammarūn (centenarians) and he was noted in Arab legends for his extremely long life. According to these fables, Zuhayr lived to 450 years of age, and his grandfather Hubal lived to 650.

In the early or mid-6th century, Zuhayr was a one-time ally of Abraha (d. c. 553), the Aksumite viceroy of South Arabia and enemy of the Meccans. Abraha gave Zuhayr authority over the related tribes of Taghlib and Banu Bakr. He led an attack by the Kalb and their South Arabian allies against the two tribes when they revolted, and took captive the Taghlibi chieftain Kulayb ibn Rabi'a and his brother Muhalhil. In his poetry, Zuhayr refers to this battle, which is recorded by many traditional Arab sources, saying "We captured Muhalhil and his brother ... May Taghlib perish because their women are herded to the market like slaves with no ornaments". After the battle, the Amilah persuaded Zuhayr to release Muhalhil and noblemen from the Bakr tribe.

Later, friendly relations existed between Zuhayr and the Meccans, including the tribe of Quraysh. When the Ghatafan tribe constructed a haram (religious sanctuary) for their idols at a place called 'Buss' to rival the Kaaba in Mecca, Zuhayr resolved to destroy it. Accounts vary as to Zuhayr's motive, with some holding that the erection of the haram offended Zuhayr because it implied Ghatafani superiority over his own tribe, and others claiming that it was a favor by Zuhayr to the Quraysh in Mecca. The former account is supported by 10th-century historian Abu al-Faraj al-Isfahani, who wrote that when Zuhayr became aware of the Ghatafan's action, he exclaimed "By God, that will never happen while I am alive! I will never leave Ghatafan alone while they take a haram". Following this, Zuhayr gathered his Kalbi tribesmen, raided and defeated the Ghatafan in their dwelling place and destroyed their haram. Afterward, "he acted graciously toward Ghatafan", releasing their women and cattle.

== Legacy ==
Zuhayr is said have killed himself by drinking unmixed wine after being disobeyed. His legend and prestige continued to hold great significance for the Kalb and the entire Quda'a confederation until at least the 8th century, i.e. two centuries into the Islamic era. His descendants, the Banu Zuhayr ibn Janab, were the preeminent family of the tribe overall until their influence gave way to a collateral branch, the Banu Haritha ibn Janab, which became prominent under Umayyad rule. Descendants of Zuhayr include al-Fahl ibn Ayyash, who reportedly killed Yazid ibn al-Muhallab in 720, the poet al-Musayyab ibn Rifall, (Note: Al-Musayabb's geneaology is traced to Zuhayr as follows: al-Musayyab ibn Rifall ibn Janab ibn Qays ibn Imru al-Qays ibn Abi Jabir ibn Zuhayr ibn Janab.) and the brothers Bishr and Hanzala ibn Safwan, the Umayyad governors of Ifriqiya (central North Africa) and al-Andalus (Spain) in the 740s.

== Bibliography ==
- Ibn Abd Rabbih (2011). Boullata, Issa J. (ed.). The Unique Necklace, Volume 3. Garnet Publishing. ISBN 9781859642399.
- Caskel, Werner (1966a). Ğamharat an-nasab: Das genealogische Werk des His̆ām ibn Muḥammad al-Kalbī, Band I [Jamharat al-nasab: The Geneaological Work of Hishām ibn Muḥammad al-Kalbī, Volume I] (in German). Leiden: Brill. OCLC 490272940.
- Caskel, Werner (1966b). Ğamharat an-nasab: Das genealogische Werk des His̆ām ibn Muḥammad al-Kalbī, Band II [Jamharat al-nasab: The Geneaological Work of Hishām ibn Muḥammad al-Kalbī, Volume II] (in German). Leiden: Brill. OCLC 490272940.
- Goldziher, Ignaz (1971). Stern, S. M. (ed.). Muslim Studies, Vol. 2. Albany: State University of New York Press. p. 160. ISBN 9780873952347.
- Krenkow, F. (1936). "Zuhair". In Houtsma, M. Th.; Wensinck, A. J.; Gibb, H. A. R. (eds.). The Encyclopædia of Islam: A Dictionary of the Geography, Ethnography and Biography of the Muhammadan Peoples. E. J. Brill. pp. 1236–1237.
- Lecker, M. (2002). "Zuhayr b. Djanāb". In Bearman, P. J.; Bianqis, Th.; Bosworth, C.E.; van Donzel, E.; Heinrichs, W. P. (eds.). The Encyclopedia of Islam. Vol. 11, V–Z (2nd ed.). Leiden: Brill. pp. 558–559. doi:10.1163/1573-3912_islam_SIM_8197. ISBN 978-90-04-12756-2.
- Munt, Harry (2014). The Holy City of Medina: Sacred Space in Early Islamic Arabia. New York: Cambridge University Press. ISBN 978-1-107-04213-1.
- Rihan, Mohammad (2014). The Politics and Culture of an Umayyad Tribe: Conflict and Factionalism in the Early Islamic Period. I. B. Tauris. ISBN 978-1-78076-564-8.
