= Al-Asbagh ibn Dhu'ala =

Umayyad commander and Banu Kalb warlord

Al-Asbagh ibn Dhu'ala al-Kalbi (Arabic: الأصبغ بن ذؤالة الكلبي) was an Umayyad commander and a warlord of the Banu Kalb tribe in Palmyra who played a prominent role in the Third Muslim Civil War (744–750) and afterward was a leader of the revolt of the Umayyad prince Abu Muhammad al-Sufyani against the Abbasids in 750–751.

== Early career ==
Al-Asbagh was of the Banu Kalb tribe of Palmyra and thus a member of the Yaman military faction opposed to the Qays (see Qays–Yaman rivalry). He served as a commander under the Umayyad general Asad ibn Abdallah al-Qasri in Khurasan, a province in the far east of the Caliphate, in 737. He was later posted to Kufa in Iraq in 739 or 740.

== Role in the Third Muslim Civil War ==
Al-Asbagh later participated in the conspiracy to kill the Umayyad caliph al-Walid II, who acceded in 743. The latter had essentially sold the champion of the Yaman, Asad's brother Khalid al-Qasri, to the Qaysi governor of Iraq, Yusuf ibn Umar al-Thaqafi, who had Khalid tortured and executed in late 743. This was perceived as a severe contempt for the Yaman by the caliph and drove many to direct vengeance against the caliph himself, a hitherto unprecedented act by the Syrian troops, the historic mainstay of the Umayyad dynasty. Al-Walid II had also run afoul of many princes of the Umayyad dynasty, particularly the sons of caliphs Hisham (r. 724–743) and al-Walid I (r. 705–715). Under the leadership of al-Walid I's son, Yazid III, these dissident Umayyads and the Yaman rebelled against al-Walid II, who was slain by a Yamani troop in April 744 while his young sons and nominated successors were jailed. Al-Asbagh afterward boasted in verse:

Inform the Qays ... and their masters from
Abd Shams and Hashim
We killed the Caliph in revenge for Khalid
And we sold the (Caliph's) heir for a few dirhams.

Yazid III acceded, but died in September 744. His brother, Ibrahim, succeeded him, but was only recognized by the Kalb-led Quda'a of southern Syria. Another Umayyad, Marwan II, with the backing of the Qays, swept to power and replaced Ibrahim as caliph in December 744. He moved the capital of the Caliphate to the Qaysi-dominated Harran and enacted a staunchly pro-Qaysi policy. In the summer of 745, al-Asbagh and his sons, Hamza, Dhu'ala, and Furafisa, left Palmyra to join the rebellion against the caliph launched by the Yaman of Homs, who had called on al-Asbagh for support. The revolt was suppressed by Marwan II and al-Asbagh escaped the city, though his sons Dhu'ala and Furafisa were captured and crucified. While Marwan pacified most of Syria, the Kalb in Palmyra under al-Asbagh were the lone holdouts. Marwan threatened to take the desert city by force, but ultimately allowed Kalbites in his camp to secure the city's surrender by diplomacy. To conclude the agreement, al-Asbagh and his son Hamza made peace with Marwan in person and the caliph tore down the city's walls. They took part in the campaigns against the Kharijites under al-Dahhak ibn Qays al-Shaybani in Iraq, but fled to Wasit, where many others of Yazid III's old supporters, including the deposed Kalbite governor of Iraq, Mansur ibn Jumhur, had taken refuge. Al-Asbagh had joined the rebellion against Marwan II led by the Umayyad prince Sulayman ibn Hisham, which petered out by 746.

== Revolt against the Abbasids ==
In 749 the Abbasid dynasty took power in Kufa and in 750 their forces routed Marwan II at the Battle of the Zab and subsequently toppled the Umayyad Caliphate. Later that year, the Iraq-based Abbasid Caliphate faced revolts in Syria by the Umayyads and their supporters, most notably that of the Umayyad prince Abu Muhammad al-Sufyani. This revolt garnered the support of both the Yaman and the Qays. Al-Asbagh likely commanded the Yamani troops of Abu Muhammad, while the Qaysites were led by the general Abu al-Ward. Al-Asbagh and Abu al-Ward were defeated by the Abbasids in a battle near Homs on 27 July 751. Abu Muhammad later barricaded with his Kalbite supporters in Palmyra before fleeing that year, thus marking an end to the revolt.

== Bibliography ==
- Caskel, Werner (1966). Ğamharat an-nasab: Das genealogische Werk des His̆ām ibn Muḥammad al-Kalbī, Volume II (in German). Leiden: Brill.
- Cobb, Paul M. (2001). White Banners: Contention in 'Abbasid Syria, 750–880. Albany, New York: SUNY Press. ISBN 978-0791448809.
- Crone, Patricia (1980). Slaves on Horses: The Evolution of the Islamic Polity. Cambridge: Cambridge University Press. ISBN 0-521-52940-9.
- Intagliata, Emanuele E. (2018) [1950]. Palmyra after Zenobia AD 273-750: An Archaeological and Historical Reappraisal. Oxford: Oxbow Books. ISBN 978-1-78570-942-5.
- Sharon, Moshe (1990). Revolt: The Social and Military Aspects of the ʻAbbāsid Revolution : Black Banners from the East II. The Max Schloessinger memorial series. Jerusalem: Max Schloessinger Memorial Fund, Hebrew University. ISBN 965-223-388-9.
- Williams, John Alden, ed. (1985). The History of al-Ṭabarī, Volume XXVII: The ʿAbbāsid Revolution, A.D. 743–750/A.H. 126–132. SUNY Series in Near Eastern Studies. Albany, New York: State University of New York Press. ISBN 978-0-87395-884-4.
