= Quda'a =

Confederation of Arab tribes

Quda'a قضاعة
- Ma'addite / Himyarite
- Nisba: Al-Quḍāʿī
- Location: Arabian Peninsula, Levant, North Africa
- Descended from: Quda'a
- Religion: Paganism, later Islam

Map of the Arabian Peninsula in 600 AD, showing the various Arab tribes and their areas of settlement. The Lakhmids (yellow) formed an Arab monarchy as clients of the Sasanian Empire, while the Ghassanids (red) formed an Arab monarchy as clients of the Roman Empire.

The Quda'a (Arabic: قضاعة, romanized: Quḍāʿa) were a confederation of Arab tribes, including the powerful Kalb and Tanukh, mainly concentrated throughout Syria and northwestern Arabia, from at least the 4th century CE, during Byzantine rule, through the 12th century, during the early Islamic era. Under the first caliphs of the Syria-based Umayyad Caliphate (661–750), the Quda'a occupied a privileged position in the administration and military. During the Second Muslim Civil War (683–692) they allied with South Arabian and other tribes in Syria as the Yaman faction in opposition to their rivals, the Qays confederation, in what became a rivalry for power and influence which continued well after the Umayyad era. In forging this alliance, the Quda'a's leaders genealogically realigned their descent to the South Arabian Himyar, discarding their north Arabian ancestor, Ma'add, a move which elicited centuries-long debate and controversy among early Islamic scholars.

== Genealogical origins and tribal alignment ==
=== Background ===
In the Arab genealogical tradition, the Arab tribes were generally divided into those with northern or southern Arabian ancestors. The ancestral origins of the Quda'a are obscure, with the claims of the early genealogists being contradictory. The Quda'a were counted among the northern Arabian Ma'add tribes in the pre-Islamic and early Islamic periods. Ma'add had been attested as a tribal confederation in the Syrian Desert as early as the 4th century. One of the prominent tribes of the Quda'a, the Banu Kalb, had been present in Syria centuries before the advent of Islam in the 630s, and since they and the wider Quda'a group had been present there for so long, the historian Patricia Crone comments that it is "pointless to speculate where they may have originally come from". The Quda'a, as well as the Kinda tribe, occupied a privileged position under Mu'awiya's governorship of Islamic Syria (639–661) and his Syria-based Umayyad Caliphate (661–680), as they were the foundation of his military strength. The alliance with Quda'a was sealed by Mu'awiya's marriage to Maysun bint Bahdal of the Kalb's leading household. The nobles of the Quda'a were granted yearly, inheritable stipends, as well as veto and consultation rights with the caliph. Under Mu'awiya's successor, his son with Maysun, Yazid I (r. 680–683), the Quda'a maintained their privileges.

=== Initial attempts to link with Himyar ===
According to several early Islamic sources, the first figure to claim South Arabian, Himyarite descent for the Quda'a was a supposed companion of Muhammad, Amr ibn Murra of the Juhayna, another major constituent tribe of the Quda'a. Amr ibn Murra urged his tribesmen in Egypt, which was conquered by the Muslim Arabs in the 640s, to join the Yamani, or South Arabian, tribes, and according to reports attributed to a late 7th-century source, Isa ibn Talha al-Taymi, and the qadi of Egypt Ibn Lahi'a (d. 790), Amr ibn Murra invoked a conversation he had with Muhammad in which the latter informed him that Quda'a stemmed from Himyar. Depending on the source, Amr ibn Murra's effort was supported by Mu'awiya or, alternatively, frowned upon by the caliph. The 8th-century genealogist al-Zubayr ibn Bakkar held that in response to Mu'awiya's order to ascertain the lineages of the Arab troops in Egypt, Amr ibn Murra proclaimed that Quda'a was a descendant of Himyar. Uqba ibn Amir, another companion of Muhammad from the Juhayna who settled in Egypt and was close to Mu'awiya, backed these claims, according to Ibn Lahi'a.

The historian Wilferd Madelung views the reports about Amr ibn Murra's Himyarite advocacy as credible, and thus dates the efforts to link Quda'a with Himyar to Mu'awiya's rule. He speculates the efforts were politically advantageous for the Quda'a as the Himyarites formed a significant proportion of the troops in Egypt and that Mu'awiya hoped to "extend his marriage alliance with Kalb indirectly to Himyar" through forging their genealogical links. Nonetheless, the Quda'a's claims of Himyarite lineage was not endorsed by the Himyar or the Kalb in Syria during Mu'awiya's caliphate. Crone, on the other hand, considers the narratives about Amr ibn Murra to be "exceedingly doubtful"; she questions his biography, as he was held to have been an old man in Muhammad's time but lived well into Mu'awiya's caliphate, and suspects that he is mainly used in the early sources to advocate for the Himyarite descent of the Quda'a. She further notes that the Quda'a did not develop an interest in Himyarite descent until well after Mu'awiya's death in 680.

Links between the Quda'a and the South Arabian tribes were also demonstrated in the reorganization of Kufa, one of the two chief Arab garrison towns of Iraq by Mu'awiya's governor there in 671. The Arab military settlers were organized into seven divisions based on their tribal origin. The soldiers who belonged to the Quda'a tribes were assigned to the same seventh as the South Arabian tribes of Azd Sarat, Hadhramawt, Kinda, Bajila and Khath'am, suggesting that the Quda'a was remembered to have had South Arabian origins. However, as they were not part of the same seventh as the Himyar, the South Arabian tribe to which the Quda'a was traditionally held to have descended from, Crone considers the relevance of the Kufan genealogists who decided the Quda'a's tribal association as "uncertain".

=== Consolidation of Quda'a–Himyar union ===
The Quda'a's privileged position in the Umayyad state during the Sufyanid period (661–684, i.e. the reigns of Mu'awiya I, Yazid I, and Mu'awiya II) caused consternation among the other tribal components in Syria. By this point, there were three major tribal confederations in Syria: the Quda'a, which had a strong presence in the central districts of Jordan, Damascus and Hims where they were allied with the tribes of Ghassan and Kinda; the more recent northern Arabian arrivals of the Qays, who were mainly concentrated in northern Syria where the Quda'a lacked a foothold; and the Qahtan, (Note: According to the historian Werner Caskel, the South Arabian tribal settlers of Homs formed an alliance based around the unifying figure of Qahtan as a shared ancestor during the reign of Yazid I.) which grouped the South Arabian Himyar, Hamdan and Ansar of Homs, which settled there during the Muslim conquest. According to Crone, the non-Quda'a tribes were essentially faced with the choice of joining or opposing the Quda'a, and the Sufyanid period "was marked by intense discussion of possible genealogical realignments" among the tribes. These deliberations were held by the 'brother' tribes of Judham, Lakhm and Amila in the southern district of Palestine, and the Kinda. At this time, the Quda'a in Syria still claimed Ma'addite descent, and sponsored efforts by the upstart Judham chief, Rawh ibn Zinba, to persuade his tribesmen and their affiliates to endorse descent from the Ma'addite Asad tribe. This effort was opposed by the bulk of the Judham under the elder chief Natil ibn Qays, who opted for lineage from Qahtan in alliance with the South Arabians of Homs.

When Yazid died during the Second Muslim Civil War in 683, followed weeks later by the death of his successor, Mu'awiya II, Yazid's son by a Kalbi woman, Umayyad rule had collapsed across the caliphate, in favor of the anti-Umayyad caliph Ibn al-Zubayr of Mecca. While the Quda'a sought to preserve Umayyad rule, and thus their privileges, their tribal opponents in Syria, including the Qahtan, the Qays, and the Judham, threw in their lot with Ibn al-Zubayr and his ally in Damascus, al-Dahhak ibn Qays al-Fihri, taking control of Syria's districts except for Quda'a-controlled Jordan. The Quda'a and their tribal allies, including the Ghassan, Kinda, Akk and Ash'ar, nominated an Umayyad from a different branch of the family, Marwan I, as caliph and together routed the much larger army of their tribal rivals under al-Dahhak at the Battle of Marj Rahit in 684. Umayyad rule was quickly reasserted across Syria, but the Qays commenced a series of raids against the Kalb to avenge their losses at Marj Rahit. According to the 8th-century Kalbi genealogists, Nasr ibn Mazru and al-Sharqi ibn Qutami, the Quda'a adopted Himyarite descent as part of an alliance with the Yamani tribes, during this period of raids and counter-raids between the Qays and the Kalb. (Note: Madelung and Crone question that Quda'a would genealogically subordinate themselves to the Himyarites during the Second Muslim Civil War period, when they had just defeated them at Marj Rahit, instead of adopting the route of other Syrian nomadic tribes, which claimed descent from Qahtan through Himyar's brother, Kahlan, thereby bypassing Himyar. Madelung interprets this as evidence that Quda'a's efforts to link with Himyar dated earlier, to Mu'awiya I's reign, when the legendary figure of Himyar was likely the ultimate unifying figure for South Arabian descent, before the rise of Qahtan as this figure during Yazid's reign. Crone dismisses Madelung's theory as insufficient.) The Ma'add confederacy in Syria was thus dissolved, and its constituents were merged with the Qahtan, i.e. the Yaman.

The historian Khalid Yahya Blankinship dates the Quda'i–Yamani union to c. 685, while the historian Werner Caskel dates it to the 690s. Yazid's son Khalid, who had been in line to succeed Marwan until the latter replaced him with his own son, Abd al-Malik, encouraged the effort to disrupt tribal support for Marwan's progeny. The Quda'a's genealogical alignment with the Yaman was sealed by the favoritism shown to Qaysi troops in the Umayyad army invading the Byzantine Empire in 715–718 by Abd al-Malik's son, the prominent general Maslama, and the considerable investments by the wealthy governor of Iraq and the eastern Caliphate, Khalid al-Qasri (r. 724–738), to persuade the chiefs of Quda'a to change their genealogy. These efforts were condemned by the more pious men of the Quda'a, such as Nasr ibn Mazru, who viewed the renouncement of the Quda'a's ancestor Ma'add to be unconscionable.

=== Controversy ===
The disputes over the Quda'a's origins elicited considerable debate among early Islamic scholars, who invoked the purported opinions of Muhammad to favor either side, while others proposed "ingenious harmonizations" of Ma'addite and Himyarite ancestries for the tribe, according to Crone. Among the alleged utterances of Muhammad were that Ma'add's kunya (paedynomic) was Abū Quḍāʿa ('Father of Quda'a'), or that Muhammad explicitly stated Quda'a was a descendant of Himyar. The 8th-century genealogist, Ibn al-Kalbi, who belonged to the Quda'a, harmonized these seemingly contradictory claims by holding that Quda'a's mother, Mu'ana, was originally the wife of Malik ibn Amr ibn Murra ibn Malik ibn Himyar, and that she afterward wed Ma'add, bringing Quda'a with her; thus Quda'a became known as a son of Ma'add, albeit not a biological one. This tradition is also espoused by a later genealogist, Ibn Abd Rabbihi (d. 940), who further notes that Quda'a was an epithet meaning 'leopard' and his actual name was Amr. The historians al-Baladhuri and Abu'l-Baqa Hibat Allah offer the opposite narrative, namely that Mu'ana was originally the wife of Ma'add, with whom she had Quda'a, and then later married Malik ibn Amr of the Himyar.

== Sub-tribes ==
The Quda'a consisted of the following tribes, though the lineage or association of some, such as the Tanukh, Khawlan and Mahra, were disputed by the traditional Arab genealogists. Over time, some tribes of Quda'a joined other confederations, adopted different lineages, and changed their tribal identity.

- Bahra', a smaller tribe which migrated from the Euphrates valley to the plains around Homs before the Muslim conquest of Syria.
- Bali, a prominent tribe whose territory abutted the Juhayna's to the north, up to the borders of Syria. The played a prominent role in the conquest of Egypt, with most of the tribe's members in Syria being relocated there in the 640s. They were present in large numbers at Fustat, Akhmim, Asyut and Ushmun, but were expelled by the Fatimids and moved southward with the Juhayna. Together the two Quda'a tribes mixed with the indigenous Beja and Baqqara tribes, contributing considerably to their Arabization and Islamization. Part of the Bali had remained in Arabia, with some accepting Saudi rule, and other parts of the tribe taking refuge with the ousted Hashemites in Transjordan.
- Balqayn, a tribe whose territory neighbored that of the Quda'a tribes of Bali, Udhra and Kalb, the last of which was the traditional rival of the Balqayn. They are last mentioned as participants in inter-tribal fighting around Damascus in the late 8th century.
- Jarm
- Juhayna, a prominent tribe whose territory spanned the northern central Hejaz (western Arabia), giving them control over a large part of the caravan routes between Syria and Mecca. They played an important role, along with other Quda'a tribes, in the Muslim conquest of Egypt in the 640s, settling in Fustat. The Juhayna of Egypt migrated to Upper Egypt during the Fatimid period (10th–12th centuries). These tribesmen went further south in the 14th century, gaining control over swathes of Nubia and eventually merging with tribes of the Sudan. The Juhayna who had remained in the Hejaz allied with the Alids, whilst retaining their tribal identity. They survived into the modern era, allying with the Hashemites, descendants of the Alids, but after the latter were ousted by the House of Saud, they became generally loyal subjects of the Saudi kingdom and play an important role in the development of their region.
- Kalb, the strongest tribe of the Quda'a whose territory historically spanned the vast steppe between Iraq and Syria, the so-called Samawa, and including the Wadi Sirhan and Dumat al-Jandal areas. After the Muslim conquest, they expanded their presence to Damascus and its environs, the Golan Heights, the upper Jordan Valley, Homs and Palmyra. The Kalb remained a potent force in Syria through the 10th century, and retained influence around Damascus into the 11th century.
- Khawlan
- Khushayn, a minor tribe
- Mahra
- Banu Nahd
- Salīḥ, a tribe historically concentrated in Wadi Sirhan and the Balqa region of Jordan. They became the dominant Arab foederati of the Byzantine Empire in the 5th century and expanded further into northern Syria. They were charged with collecting taxes from the Bedouins seeking to dwell within the Limes Arabicus. The Salihids were replaced by the Ghassanids as the chief foederati of the Byzantines in the early 6th century but remained in Byzantine service and staunchly Christian until the Muslim conquest of Syria in the 630s. They likely joined the Quda'a during Umayyad rule, in the aftermath of the Kalb's victory at Marj Rahit, and are last heard of dwelling around Latakia and al-Balqa in the 9th century.
- Tanukh, originally a confederation of different tribes which migrated from eastern Arabia to modern Iraq and became one of the main Arab groups of the city of al-Hirah. Sections of the Tanukh moved to Syria where, in the 4th century, they became the first Arab foederati of the Byzantines before being replaced by the Salhids. They remained staunch Christian allies of Byzantium until the Muslim conquest of Syria in the 630s. The Tanukh remained settled in northern Syria and largely retained their Christian faith. It was likely only after the Battle of Marj Rahit, where the Tanukh fought alongside the Umayyads, that the tribe became members of the Quda'a. The Tanukh converted to Islam during Abbasid rule and in the 9th century migrated to the Syrian coastal mountains. In the 11th century, Tanukhid families established themselves in and around Beirut, where they embraced the Druze faith and remained a local force until early Ottoman rule.
- Udhra, a tribe historically established in the Wadi al-Qura area on the borderlands between Syria and the Hejaz. They were allies of the Jewish agriculturalists of that region and had close ties with the inhabitants of Yathrib. Some of their tribesmen migrated into Syria and a number served important positions under the Umayyad caliphs there.

== Bibliography ==
- Blankinship, Khalid Yahya (1994). The End of the Jihâd State: The Reign of Hishām ibn ʻAbd al-Malik and the Collapse of the Umayyads. Albany, New York: State University of New York Press. ISBN 978-0-7914-1827-7.
- Bosworth, C. E. (1960). "Bahrāʾ". In Gibb, H. A. R.; Kramers, J. H.; Lévi-Provençal, E.; Schacht, J.; Lewis, B. & Pellat, Ch. (eds.). The Encyclopaedia of Islam, Second Edition. Volume I: A–B. Leiden: E. J. Brill. p. 938. OCLC 495469456.
- Caskel, Werner (1966a). Ğamharat an-nasab: Das genealogische Werk des His̆ām ibn Muḥammad al-Kalbī, Volume I (in German). Leiden: Brill. OCLC 490272940.
- Caskel, Werner (1966b). Ğamharat an-nasab: Das genealogische Werk des His̆ām ibn Muḥammad al-Kalbī, Volume II (in German). Leiden: Brill. OCLC 490272940.
- Crone, Patricia (1980). Slaves on Horses: The Evolution of the Islamic Polity (1980 ed.). Cambridge: Cambridge University Press. ISBN 978-0521229616.
- Crone, Patricia (1994). "Were the Qays and Yemen of the Umayyad Period Political Parties?". Der Islam. 71 (1). Walter de Gruyter and Co.: 1–57. doi:10.1515/islm.1994.71.1.1. ISSN 0021-1818.
- Dixon, A. A. (1978). "Kalb b. Wabara—Islamic Period". In van Donzel, E.; Lewis, B.; Pellat, Ch. & Bosworth, C. E. (eds.). The Encyclopaedia of Islam, Second Edition. Volume IV: Iran–Kha. Leiden: E. J. Brill. pp. 493–494. ISBN 978-90-04-05745-6. OCLC 758278456.
- Kister, M. J.; Plessner, M. (1976). "Notes on Caskel's Ğamharat an-Nasab". Oriens. 25: 48–68. doi:10.2307/1580656. ISBN 978-1-000-58502-5. JSTOR 1580656.
- Kister, M. J. (1986). "Kuḍāʿa". In Bosworth, C. E.; van Donzel, E.; Lewis, B. & Pellat, Ch. (eds.). The Encyclopaedia of Islam, Second Edition. Volume V: Khe–Mahi. Leiden: E. J. Brill. pp. 315–318. ISBN 978-90-04-07819-2.
- Lecker, M. (2000). "ʿUdhra". In Bearman, P. J.; Bianquis, Th.; Bosworth, C. E.; van Donzel, E. & Heinrichs, W. P. (eds.). The Encyclopaedia of Islam, Second Edition. Volume X: T–U. Leiden: E. J. Brill. pp. 773–774. ISBN 978-90-04-11211-7.
- Madelung, Wilferd (1986). "Apocalyptic Prophecies in Ḥimṣ in the Umayyad Age". Journal of Semitic Studies. 31 (2).
- Shahid, I. (1995). "Salīḥ". In Bosworth, C. E.; van Donzel, E.; Heinrichs, W. P. & Lecomte, G. (eds.). The Encyclopaedia of Islam, Second Edition. Volume VIII: Ned–Sam. Leiden: E. J. Brill. pp. 981–982. ISBN 978-90-04-09834-3.
- Shahid, I. (2000). "Tanūkh". In Bearman, P. J.; Bianquis, Th.; Bosworth, C. E.; van Donzel, E. & Heinrichs, W. P. (eds.). The Encyclopaedia of Islam, Second Edition. Volume X: T–U. Leiden: E. J. Brill. pp. 190–192. ISBN 978-90-04-11211-7.
- Watt, W. Montgomery (1978). "Al-Kayn". In van Donzel, E.; Lewis, B.; Pellat, Ch. & Bosworth, C. E. (eds.). The Encyclopaedia of Islam, Second Edition. Volume IV: Iran–Kha. Leiden: E. J. Brill. pp. 819–820. ISBN 978-90-04-05745-6. OCLC 758278456.
