= Wadi Sirhan =

Valley in Jordan and Saudi Arabia

Coordinates: 31.0000°N 37.7500°E

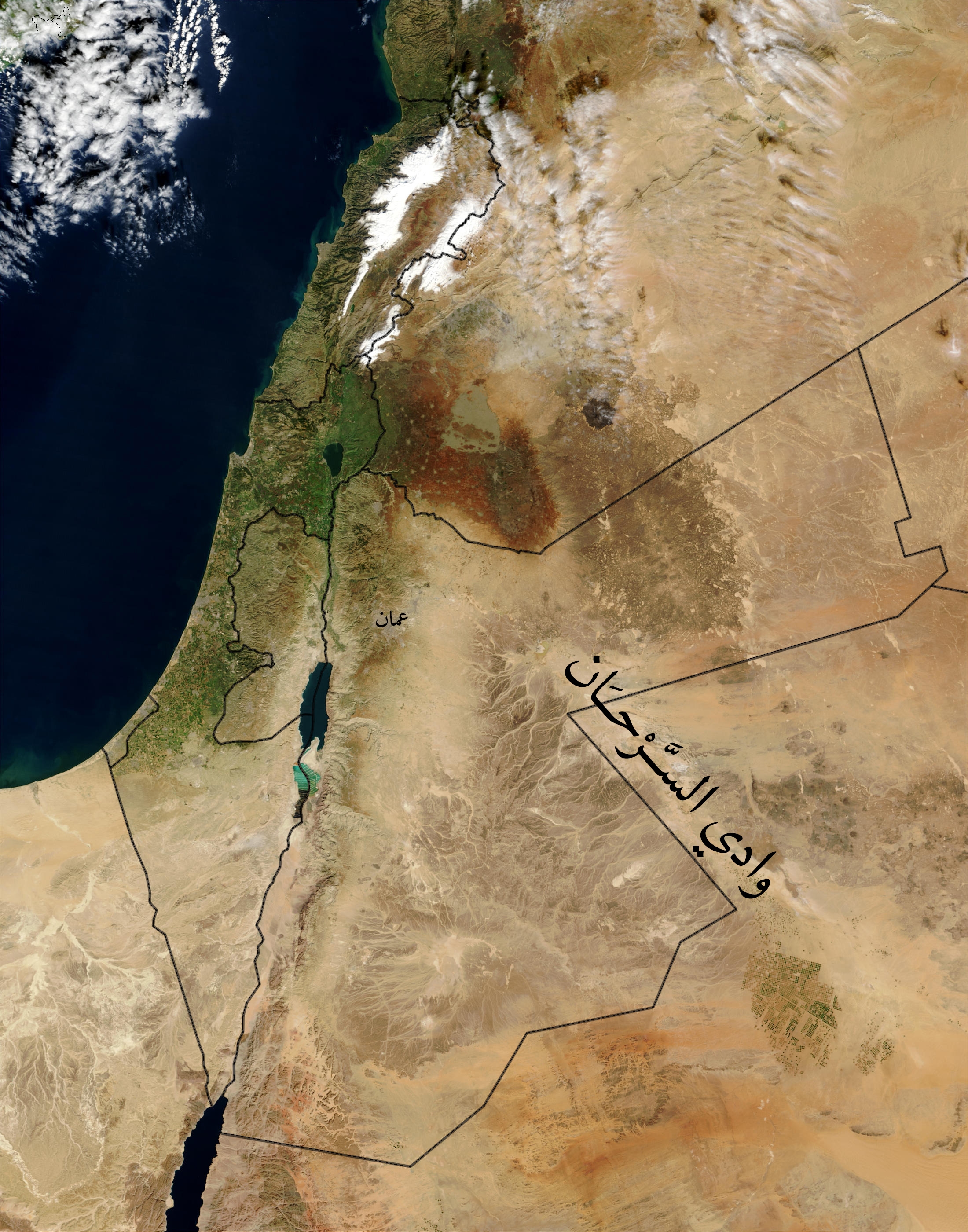
Location of Wadi Sirhan (indicated in Arabic)

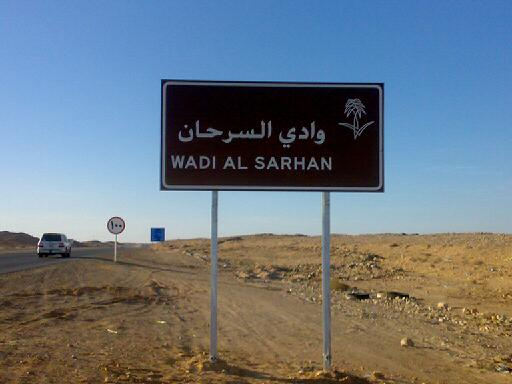
Road sign for Wadi Sirhan in Saudi Arabia

Wadi Sirhan or Wadi Al-Sarhan (Arabic: وَادِي سِرْحَان, romanized: Wādī Sirḥān, lit. 'Valley of Sirhan') is a wide depression in the northwestern Arabian Peninsula. It runs from the Al-Jouf Province in Saudi Arabia northwestward into Jordan. It historically served as a major trade and transportation route between Syria and Arabia. From antiquity until the early 20th century, control of Wadi Sirhan was often contested by various Arab tribes. The valley is named after the Sirhan tribe which migrated there in the mid-17th century. Sirhan can also mean wolf in certain Arabic dialects.

== Geography ==
Wadi Sirhan is a wide, enclosed depression that starts in the Al-Jouf Province in Saudi Arabia (elevation 525 m) and runs 140 kilometers (87 mi) northeast into Jordan, ending in the wells of Maybuʿ. Its breadth varies 5–18 kilometers (3.1–11.2 mi). According to the historian Irfan Shahîd, "the term wādī, which suggests a narrow passageway, might seem misapplied" to Wadi Sirhan, a "broad lowland". The Czech explorer Alois Musil described it as a "sandy, marshy lowland" with scattered hillocks.

== History ==
Wadi Sirhan historically served as an important trade route between Arabia and Syria. The Assyrian king Esarhaddon launched a campaign against the Bazu and Khazu tribes in Wadi Sirhan in the 7th century BCE.

=== Roman and Byzantine eras ===
The basin continued to serve as an important route during the Roman era, connecting the Arabia Petraea province with the Arabian Peninsula. Though its strategic value emanated from its role as a gateway for trans-Arabian trade and transportation, Wadi Sirhan was also a significant source of salt. At its northern end, it was guarded by the fortress of Azraq, while its southern end was guarded by the fortress of Dumat al-Jandal. At both forts inscriptions were found indicating the presence of troops from the Bosra-based Legio III Cyrenaica.

Wadi Sirhan was the region from which the Salihids entered Syria and became the principal Arab federates of the Byzantine Empire throughout the 5th century CE. When the Salihids were succeeded by the Ghassanids at the beginning of the 6th century, Wadi Sirhan came to be dominated by the latter's allies, the Banu Kalb. The Ghassanids were charged by the Byzantines with supervision over the region after Emperor Justinian I dismantled the Limes Arabicus, a series of garrisoned fortifications guarding the empire's eastern desert frontiers, c. 530. The Ghassanids and the Kalb essentially supplanted the limes. The Ghassanid phylarch Arethas passed through the depression on his way to defeating the Banu Tamim. Likewise, Alqama, a poet of the latter tribe, passed through Wadi Sirhan to meet with Arethas to lobby for his brother's release from captivity.

=== Early Islamic era ===
Following the Muslim conquest in 634 CE, the basin became an often fought over frontier between the Banu Kalb and their distant kinsmen from the Banu al-Qayn.

=== Modern era ===
The lowland gained its current name following the migration of the Sirhan tribe, purported descendants of the Banu Kalb, to the Dumat al-Jandal region from the Hauran c. 1650. Before their migration, Wadi Sirhan was known as Wadi al-Azraq after the Azraq oasis.

During the Arab Revolt, T. E. Lawrence said of the Wadi, "We found the Sirhan not a valley, but a long fault draining the country on each side of it and collecting the waters into the successive depressions of its bed."

By the late 19th century, the Ruwalla, which is a Saudi tribe, were the predominant Bedouin tribe of Wadi Sirhan. Nuri Shalan, the emir of the tribe from 1904 to 1942, was a signatory of the Hadda Agreement between the Emirate of Transjordan and the Sultanate of Nejd, the precursors of modern-day Jordan and Saudi Arabia, respectively. The treaty resulted in most of Wadi Sirhan becoming part of Saudi Arabia, while Jordan retained the basin's northwestern corner around Azraq.

== See also ==
- Harrat al-Sham
- Syrian desert

== Bibliography ==
- Lancaster, William; Lancaster, Fidelity (1999). People, Land and Water in the Arab Middle East: Environments and Landscapes in the Bilad ash-Sham. Harwood Academic Publishers. ISBN 90-5702-322-9.
- Peake Pasha, F. G. (1958). A History of Jordan and its Tribes. Miami: University of Miami Press.
- Shahid, Irfan (2009). Byzantium and the Arabs in the Sixth Century, Volume 2, Part 2. Washington, D. C.: Dumbarton Oaks Research Library and Collection. ISBN 978-0-88402-347-0.
- van Donzel, E. (1997). "Sirhan". In Bosworth, C. E.; van Donzel, E.; Heinrichs, W. P. & Lecomte, G. (eds.). The Encyclopaedia of Islam, Second Edition. Volume IX: San–Sze. Leiden: E. J. Brill. p. 673. ISBN 978-90-04-10422-8.
