= Gharandal =

Gharandal غرندل
- Town
- Location within Jordan
- Coordinates: 30°42′55″N 35°39′00″E
- Country: Jordan
- Province: Tafilah Governorate

Population (2015)
  - Total: 4,680
- Time zone: GMT +2
  - Summer (DST): +3
- Area code: +(962)3

Gharandal (Arabic: غرندل) is a town in the Tafilah Governorate in southern Jordan, located about 15 kilometres (9.3 mi) south-southeast of the governorate capital Tafilah. It is identified with Arindela (Ancient Greek: Ἀρίνδηλα), a town in the late Roman province of Palaestina Salutaris, also called Palaestina Tertia.

== History ==
=== Byzantine period ===
The town, situated at 1,300 metres (4,300 ft) above sea level, became prominent in Byzantine times, ranking third among the cities of Palaestina Tertia. Arindela was also a Christian bishopric. One of its bishops, Theodorus, took part in the Council of Ephesus in 431. Another, Macarius, participated in a council held at Jerusalem in 536. No longer a residential bishopric, Arindela is today listed by the Catholic Church as a titular see.

=== Early Muslim period ===
Arindela became known as Arandal under Arab rule, which began after it was conquered during the early stage of the Muslim conquest of Syria in c. 634. It was held by al-Baladhuri to have surrendered without resistance to one of the chief commanders of the conquest, Yazid ibn Abi Sufyan. It became part of the large military district of Damascus. The 9th-century geographer al-Yaqubi mentions that it was the center of the Jibal subdistrict and its population at that time consisted of Ghassanid and Balqayn tribesmen. By the 10th century, the center of Jibal shifted to the neighboring town of Ruwath. In the 13th century, it is mentioned as a village by the geographer Yaqut al-Hamawi.

=== Modern period ===
The Byzantine and Islamic remains of old Gharandal, the name by which it is presently known, have largely been overtaken by the modern town of the same name. Most of the modern town's population, which was 4,680 in the 2015 Jordanian census, were originally from nearby Buseira and the town is part of the Buseira District of the Tafilah Governorate.

== Bibliography ==
- Walmsley, Alan G.; Grey, Anthony D. (2001). "An Interim Report on the Pottery from Gharandal (Arindela), Jordan". Levant. 33: 139–164. doi:10.1179/lev.2001.33.1.139. S2CID 161911840.
- Schick, Robert (2021). "The Settlement Pattern of Southern Jordan: The Nature of the Evidence". In King, Geoffrey; Cameron, Averil (eds.). The Byzantine and Early Islamic Near East: Volume 2: Land Use and Settlement Patterns. Gerlach Press. pp. 133–154. ISBN 978-0-87850-106-9.
- Shahid, I. (2002). Byzantium and the Arabs in the Sixth Century. Washington, D. C.: Dumbarton Oaks Research Library and Collection. ISBN 0-88402-284-6.
- Le Strange, G. (1890). Palestine Under the Moslems: A Description of Syria and the Holy Land from A.D. 650 to 1500. Committee of the Palestine Exploration Fund.
