= Expedition of 'Abd al-Rahman ibn 'Awf =

Event in early Islamic history

Expedition of ‘Abd al-Rahman ibn ‘Awf
Date	December 627 AD in 8th month, 6 AH
Location	Dumat al-Jandal, North of Saudi Arabia now
Result	Successful operation, Banu Kalb agree to pay Jizyah; King of Banu Kalb and some tribe members accept Islam; ‘Abd al-Rahman marries the King's daughter

Commanders and leaders
‘Abd al-Rahman ibn ‘Awf	Al Asbagh

Strength
700	Unknown

The expedition of ‘Abd al-Rahman ibn ‘Awf, also known as the Second Expedition of Dumatul Jandal took place in December, 627AD, 8th(Sha'ban) month of 6AH of the Islamic calendar. ‘Abd al-Rahman ibn ‘Awf was sent on a Mission to win over the Banu Kalb tribe and get them to adopt Islam and side with the Muslims, this operation was carried out successfully.

== The Expedition ==
Muhammad appointed ‘Abd al-Rahman ibn ‘Awf to head to Dumatul Jandal to win over the people. It is reported by the Muslim Scholar Ibn Hisham, that he told ‘Abd al-Rahman:

Fight everyone in the way of God and kill those who disbelieve in God. Do not be deceitful with spoils, do not be treacherous, nor mutilate, do not kill children. This is God’s ordinance and practice of his prophet among you.

‘Abd al-Rahman set out with 700 men on an expedition to Dumat al-Jandal, that is on the route to Khaybar, Fadak. The place was a great trading center; the inhabitants were mainly Christians and were ruled by a Christian king. Following the Islamic rule, on reaching Dumatul Jandal, ‘Abd al-Rahman summoned the people of the tribe to embrace Islam within three days grace.

During the 3 day period, Al-Asbagh, a Christian chief of Banu Kalb complied and many of his followers also followed suit. Other tribes also paid tribute (Jizya) to ‘Abd al-Rahman. On agreement to pay Jizya tax regularly, they were allowed to keep their Christianity.

Muhammad received the news through a Messenger, and then instructed ‘Abd al-Rahman to marry Tamadhir, the daughter of the Christian chief, Al-Asbagh. So ‘Abd al-Rahman married Tumadhir bint Asbagh, the daughter of the Christian king and brought this lady with him to Medina.
