= Banu al-Qayn =

Arab tribe

Banū al-Qayn (Arabic: بنو القين) (also spelled Banūʾl Qayn, Balqayn or al-Qayn ibn Jasr) were an Arab tribe that was active between the early Roman era in the Near East through the early Islamic era (7th–8th centuries CE), as far as the historical record is concerned.

== Origins ==
According to traditional Arab genealogy, the Banu al-Qayn was founded by a certain al-Nu'man ibn Jasr, who was known as al-Qayn (the iron smith). However, according to all historical indications, the tribe was strictly Bedouin and its tribesmen did not involve themselves in metalwork. The Banu al-Qayn formed part of the Quda'a, a large tribal confederation.

== History ==
According to historian Irfan Shahid, "it is almost certain" that the Banu al-Qayn, along with the Judham and Amila tribes, "functioned as military units in the Roman period, forming part of the Nabatean confederacy". Moreover, Shahid argues the Banu al-Qayn dated back to the biblical era and "represent[ed] the strand of ethnographic continuity in the region, running from biblical to Byzantine to Muslim Arab times". In the 4th century CE, the tribe's dwelling places were in Transjordan and they served as foederati (federates) of the Byzantine Empire. They were among the Arab foederati, including the Banu Kalb, Judham, Bali, and Lakhm, that fought the Muslim Arabs at the Battle of Mu'tah in 629. However, at least part of the Banu al-Qayn was on friendly terms with the Muslims for the latter had hoped for help from the Banu al-Qayn during the Battle of Chains that same year. They again appear fighting for the Byzantines against the Muslims at the battles of Yarmouk and Fahl.

Most of the tribe converted to Islam following the Muslim conquest of Syria, which concluded in 638. The Banu al-Qayn, along with other Quda'a tribes, such as the Banu Kalb, backed Marwan I in the latter's bid to become caliph during the Second Muslim Civil War. During a territorial dispute between the Banu al-Qayn and Banu Kalb over Wadi Sirhan, Marwan's son and successor, Abd al-Malik, ruled in favor of the Kalb. About six hundred al-Qayni tribesmen took part in the Umayyad campaign against the Kharijite rebel Bahlul in 737. According to historian W. Montgomery Watt, "the last that is heard" of the Banu al-Qayn was in 792, during the Abbasid era, when they were involved in intertribal fighting in Damascus. However, the late 9th-century geographer al-Ya'qubi held that the town of Arandal, an administrative center in southern Transjordan, was populated by the Banu al-Qays along with the Ghassanids.

== Bibliography ==
- Watt, W. Montgomery (1991) [1978]. "Al-Kayn". In Lewis, B.; Pellat, Ch.; Schacht, J. (eds.). The Encyclopedia of Islam. Vol. 4 Ira-Kha (2nd ed.). Leiden and New York: Brill. pp. 819–820. ISBN 90-04-07026-5.
- Shahid, Irfan (2002). Byzantium and the Arabs in the Sixth Century. Washington, D. C.: Dumbarton Oaks Research Library and Collection. ISBN 0-88402-284-6.
