= Bahra' =

Bahrāʾ بَهْرَاء
- Arab tribe
- Ethnicity: Quda'i
- Nisba: Bahrānī (بَهْرَانِي)
- Location: Middle Euphrates Valley (late 6th century–8th century); Plains of Homs and Hama (8th/9th century); Jabal Bahra' (10th century)
- Descended from: Bahra' ibn 'Amr
- Religion: Monophysite Christianity (ca. 580–630s CE); Islam (post 630s)

The Bahra' (Arabic: بَهْرَاء, romanized: Bahrāʾ) were an Arab tribe that inhabited the middle Euphrates valley around the trade center and Arab Christian holy city of Resafa during the late Byzantine era, and later the Homs region of central Syria during the Islamic era. After converting to Christianity, and becoming part of the Ghassanid-led tribal federates of the Byzantines in the late 6th century, the Bahra' were tasked with guarding Resafa. They were part of Byzantine–Arab coalitions against the nascent Arab Muslims in 629, 633 and 634, before ultimately converting to Islam after the Muslim conquest of Syria. In the following centuries they mostly inhabited central Syria, lending their name to the area's Jabal Bahra' range.

== History ==
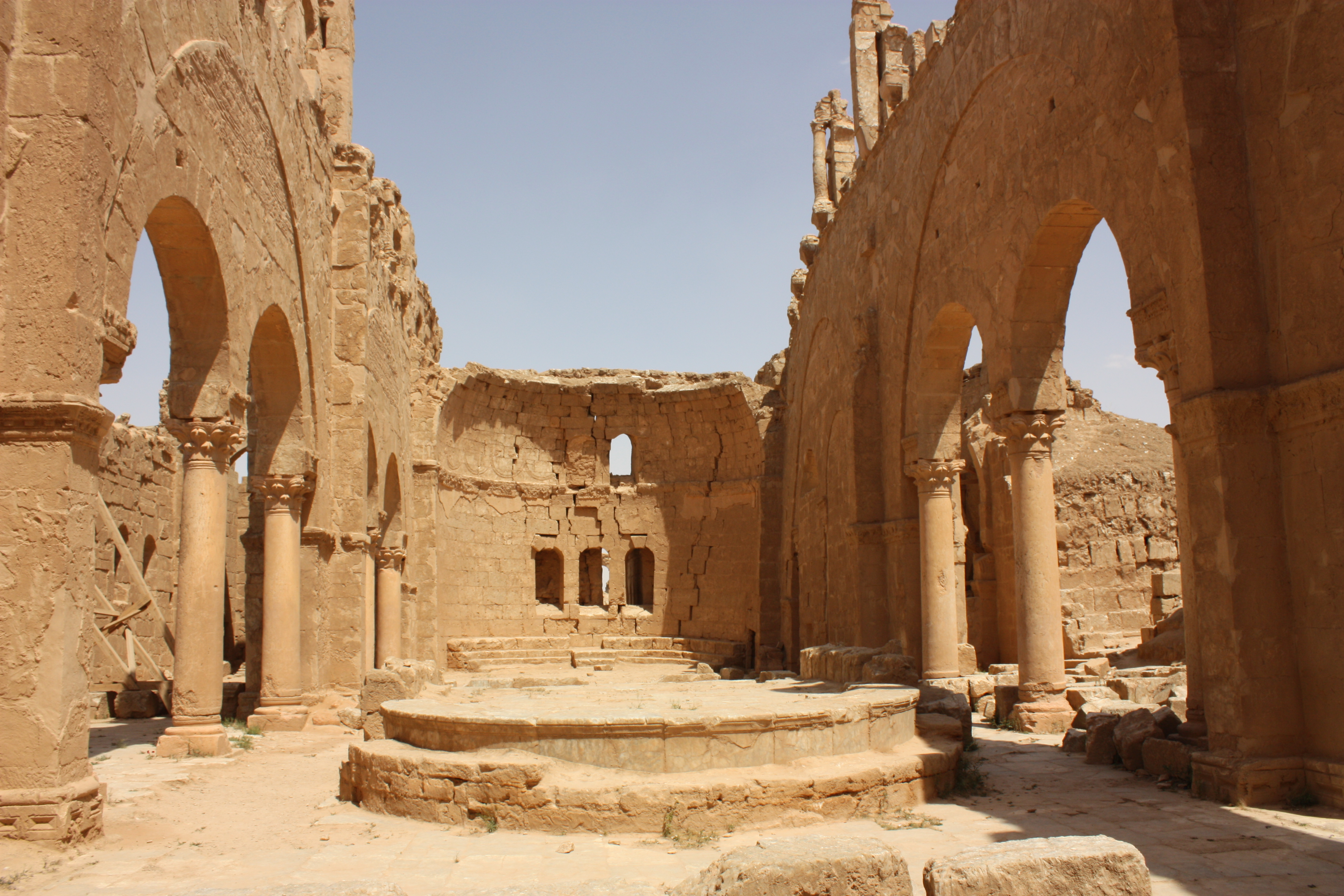
Ruins of the basilica of St. Sergius in Resafa, which the Bahra' tribe were in charge of protecting as tribal federates of the Byzantine Empire

The general consensus is that the Bahra' belonged to the Quda'a, an Arabian tribal confederation with unclear roots, though a minority of sources place them as part of Yemenite tribal grouping, the Banu Judham. According to Arab genealogical tradition, as chronicled by Ibn Abd Rabbih (d. 960), the tribe's progenitor was a certain Bahra' ibn Amr ibn al-Haf ibn Quda’a. This tradition holds that Bahra' had five sons Ahwad, Qasit, Abada, Qasr and Adi, all of whose progeny became large clans of the tribe.

There are scant records of the Bahra' tribe in the pre-Islamic era, but it is apparent that they were part of the Ghassanid-led Arab tribal federates of the Byzantine Empire in the Syrian Desert. The tribe is mentioned in a single verse of an Arabic poem from that era which has them based in Resafa (Sergiopolis), a trading post between Syrian Palmyra and Mesopotamian Sura that also contained a shrine dedicated to St. Sergius; the latter was venerated by the Arab Christian federate tribes. The verse, recorded in the Al-Mufaddaliyyat, read: "And as for Bahra', they are a group whose place we know. They have a path around Resafa that is clear."

It is not known when the Bahra' converted to Christianity but it was most likely when they entered Byzantium's service and allied with the Christian Ghassanid leaders of the federates in the late 6th century. Their prior paganism is noted in a pre-Islamic poem in which they mocked the "Christian swords" of the Taghlib tribe. According to historian Clifford Edmund Bosworth, they converted in circa 580, after the Tanukh and Taghlib, the Bahra's tribal neighbors in the middle Euphrates. Historian Irfan Shahid stipulates that the Bahra' were in charge of protecting Resafa and the trade routes running through it from non-federate Bedouin tribes and the Lakhmids, guarding the pilgrimage shrine of St. Sergius, and possibly facilitating supplies to the town.

The Bahra' were among the Arab federate tribes in the Byzantine army at the Battle of Mu'ta in 629 in which the latter defeated the newly ascendant Muslim Arabs. In 633, the Bahra' and Byzantium's allied Arab tribes were mobilized to combat the Arab Muslim forces of Khalid ibn al-Walid at the Battle of Dumat al-Jandal but were defeated. The Bahra' fought once more in the Byzantine–Arab Christian coalition against the Muslims in 634. However, following the conquest of Syria (634–638), they converted to Islam. They ultimately migrated west to the plains of the Homs region. The 9th-century geographer al-Ya'qubi noted that the Bahra' and Tanukh tribes predominated in Hama. By the time the Arab ruler Sayf al-Dawla formed his emirate in northern Syria in the 10th century, the abode of the Bahra' lay in the mountainous coastal region between Latakia and Tripoli. From around that time, the Syrian Coastal Mountain Range became known as the "Jabal Bahra'" after the tribe.

== Bibliography ==
- Bianquis, Thierry (1997). "Sayf al-Dawla". In Bosworth, C. E.; van Donzel, E.; Heinrichs, W. P. & Lecomte, G. (eds.). The Encyclopaedia of Islam, Second Edition. Volume IX: San–Sze. Leiden: E. J. Brill. pp. 103–110. doi:10.1163/1573-3912_islam_COM_1010. ISBN 978-90-04-10422-8.
- Bosworth, C. E. (1960). "Bahrā'". In Gibb, H. A. R.; Kramers, J. H.; Lévi-Provençal, E.; Schacht, J. (eds.). The Encyclopedia of Islam. Vol. I, A–B (new ed.). Leiden and New York: Brill. ISBN 978-90-04-08114-7.
- Ibn 'Abd Rabbih (2011). Boullata, Emeritus Issa J. (ed.). The Unique Necklace, Volume III. Reading: Garnet Publishing Limited & Southern Court. ISBN 9781859642405.
- Salibi, Kamal (2005). A House of Many Mansions: The History of Lebanon Reconsidered. London: I. B. Tauris. ISBN 978-1860649127.
- Shahid, Irfan (1984). Byzantium and the Arabs in the Fourth Century. Washington, D.C.: Dumbarton Oaks Research Library and Collection. ISBN 978-0-88402-116-2.
- Shahid, Irfan (2002). Byzantium and the Arabs in the Sixth Century, Volume 2, Part 1. Washington, D.C.: Dumbarton Oaks Research Library and Collection. ISBN 978-0-88402-284-8.
