= Muhammad ibn as-Sā'ib al-Kalbī =

Muhammad ibn al-Sā'ib al-Kalbī
- محمد بن السائب الكلبي

Personal life
- Born: 675 AD Kufa, Iraq, Umayyad Empire
- Died: 763 AD Kufa, Abbasid Empire
- Main interest(s): Tafsir, Genealogy, History
- Notable work(s): Tafsir al-Kalbī, Genealogical works
- Occupation: Scholar, Historian, Genealogist

Religious life
- Religion: Islam
- Denomination: Shia

Muslim leader
- Influenced: Hishām ibn al-Kalbī, Sufyan al-Thawri, Ibn Ishaq, Hammad ibn Salamah, Shu'bah

Muhammad ibn al-Sā'ib al-Kalbī, also known as Abū n-Nadr, was an Arab Abbasid scholar and polymath from Kufa. Born around 675 AD, al-Kalbī is well-regarded for his contributions to Islamic historiography, tafsir (Qur'anic exegesis), and genealogical literature. His works have been foundational to later Islamic traditions and historical chronicles. However, according to Al-Dhahabi, his hadith was considered non-trustworthy since he was a Shia. Among his famous students were his son, Sufyan al-Thawri and the prominent historian Ibn Ishaq.

Al-Kalbi lived at a time when most scholars were preoccupied with the "science" of Hadith. As a result, the bulk of Muslim historians, who lived and wrote much later, documented the early history of the Muslim community while ignoring anything that came before Islam. Al-Kalbi was a prominent exception to his time's intellectual norms, focusing much of his efforts on the study of pre-Islamic religion and Arabian history.

== Early life and education ==
Muhammad ibn as-Sā'ib al-Kalbī was born and raised in Kufa, Iraq. He received his education there and was known for not traveling extensively, unlike many of his contemporaries. His grandfather, his father and his uncles fought alongside Ali's army in the Battle of Siffin and the Battle of the Camel. His father later fought and died alongside Mus'ab ibn al-Zubayr in 691.

His scholarly pursuits were profoundly influenced by his upbringing and the rich intellectual environment of Kufa.

== Career ==
=== Contributions to Islamic scholarship ===
Al-Kalbī's most significant contributions lie in his works on tafsir and genealogy. His commentary on the Qur'an, known as "Tafsir al-Kalbī, has been influential in shaping later exegesis. Additionally, his genealogical works, including those recounting the histories of various Arab tribes, are considered critical sources of historical knowledge.

=== Historiographical works ===
Al-Kalbī's historical narratives provide valuable insights into early Islamic history. His accounts of idol veneration in pre-Islamic Arabia are particularly notable.

== Controversies and criticisms ==
Despite his contributions, al-Kalbī's works have not been free from criticism. Some modern scholars debate the authenticity and reliability of his narrations, particularly those attributed to Ibn Abbas.

== Death and legacy ==
Muhammad ibn as-Sā'ib al-Kalbī died in 763 AD (146 AH). His legacy, however, endures through his extensive body of work and the influence he continues to wield in Islamic scholarship. His son, Hisham ibn al-Kalbi, also followed in his footsteps, becoming a renowned scholar and narrator.
