= Yaman (tribal group) =

Former Arab tribal confederation

Yaman was an Arab tribal confederation, originating from South Arabia, known for their centuries-long rivalry with the Qays, another Arab tribal confederation. As late as the nineteenth century battles were fought in Palestine between Qays and Yaman groups.

The Yamanis supported the Umayyads which was integral to them coming to power in the first Muslim civil war (fitna) from 656 to 661 and to them regaining power in the second Muslim civil war from 683 to 692.

In Umayyad times, the Yaman tribes mostly settled in southern Syria, in the steppes around Homs, Palmyra, and Palestine, while the Qays settled in northern Syria, in Jund Qinnasrin, the Jazira, and the Byzantine frontier areas. Another difference between the confederations was that some of the Yamani tribes like the Kalb, Tanukh, Judham, and Tayy had been extant in the Levant before the Muslim conquest, while most of the Qaysi tribes arrived afterwards. Other Yamani tribes such as Madh'hij, Kinda and Himyar, settled in after the Islamic conquest.

== Yaman tribes ==
- Azd
- Kalb
- Judham
- Ghassan
- Kinda
- Lakhm
- Madh'hij
- Quda'a
- Khuza’ah
- ’Amilah
- Himyar

== Notable battles ==
- Battle of Marj Rahit (684)

== See also ==
- Qays
- Qays–Yaman rivalry
- Qays–Yaman war (793–796)

== Sources ==
- Kennedy, Hugh N. (2004). The Prophet and the Age of the Caliphates: The Islamic Near East from the 6th to the 11th Century (Second ed.). Harlow: Pearson Education Limited. ISBN 0-582-40525-4.
- Rihan, Mohammad (2014). The Politics and Culture of an Umayyad Tribe: Conflict and Factionalism in the Early Islamic Period. Bloomsbury Publishing. ISBN 978-0-85772-405-2.
- Nicholson, Oliver (2018). The Oxford Dictionary of Late Antiquity. OUP Oxford. ISBN 978-0-19-256246-3.
