= Johann Fück =

German Orientalist (1894–1974)

- Born: Johann Wilhelm Fück; 8 July 1894; Frankfurt, Hesse, Germany
- Died: 24 November 1974 (aged 80); Halle, Saxony-Anhalt, Germany
- Occupation: Orientalist

Johann Wilhelm Fück (8 July 1894 – 24 November 1974) was a German Orientalist.

Starting in 1913, Fück studied classical and Semitic philology at Martin Luther University of Halle-Wittenberg and Goethe University Frankfurt. From 1919 to 1921 he was a member of the German National People's Party. His promotion took place in 1921 as part of the Orientalist Seminar at Goethe University Frankfurt, where he had lectureships in Hebrew language from 1921 to 1930, and in Arabic philology and Islamic studies from 1935 to 1938. He attained his habilitation in 1929. In the interim from 1930 to 1935, he was a professor at the University of Dhaka, Bangladesh. In 1938 Fück went back to Martin Luther University of Halle-Wittenberg where he remained until his retirement in 1962. In Halle he was also the director of the library of the Deutsche Morgenländische Gesellschaft (German Oriental Society).

Along with Karl Vollers and Régis Blachère, Fück was an important early researcher into the language of the Quran.

== Works (select) ==
- Muhammad ibn Ishaq: literarhistorische Untersuchungen (doctoral dissertation). Goethe-Universität Frankfurt am Main. 1925.
- "Eine arabische Literaturgeischichte aus dem10Jahrhundert". Zeitschrift der Deutschen Morgenländischen Gesellschaft. 1930. (Der Fihrist des Ibn an-Nadīm)
- Arabiya: Untersuchungen zur arabischen Sprach- und Stilgeschichte. Abhandlungen der sächsischen Akademie der Wissenschaften zu Leipzig; phil.-hist. Klasse. Vol. 45. Berlin. 1950.
- Hartmann, Richard; Scheel, Helmuth, eds. (1944). "Die arabischen Studien in Europa vom 12. bis in den Anfang des 19. Jahrhunderts". Beiträge zur Arabistik, Semitistik und Islamwissenschaft. Leipzig: O. Harrassowitz.
- Günther, Sebastian, ed. (1999). Vorträge über den Islam. Hallesche Beiträge zur Orientwissenschaft. Halle: Martin-Luther-Universität Halle-Wittenberg.
- Fück, Johann Ambix (1951). "The Arabic Literature of Alchemy According to al-Nadim (AD. 987). A Translation of the Tenth Discourse of the Book of the Catalogue (Al-Fihrist) with Introduction and Commentary". Society for the Study of Alchemy and Early Chemistry. IV (3&4 Feb). London: 81–144.
- Eine arabische Literaturgeschichte aus dem 10 Jahrhundert N. Chr. Vol. IX. Zeitschrift der deutschen morganländischen Gesellschaft, New Series.
- Neue Materialien zum Fihrist. Vol. XV (New Ser. ed.). ibid. 1936. pp. 298–321.
- Some Hitherto Unpublished Texts on the Mu'tazilite Movement from Ibn-al-Nadim's Kitab al-Fihrist. Lahore: Punjab University Press, n.d.
