= Hisham ibn al-Kalbi =

Arab historian (737–819)

Hishām ibn al-Kalbī هشام ابن الكلبي
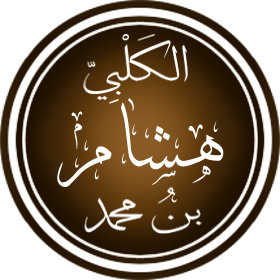

Personal life
- Born: 737 CE Kufa, Iraq Umayyad Empire
- Died: 819 CE Kufa, Abbasid Empire
- Parent: Muhammad ibn as-Sā'ib al-Kalbī (father)
- Main interest: History
- Notable idea(s): Theory of all Arabs being descended from Ishmael, the son of Abraham
- Notable work(s): Jamharat al-Ansab, Kitab al-Asnam

Religious life
- Religion: Islam
- Denomination: Shia

Muslim leader
- Influenced by: Muhammad ibn as-Sā'ib al-Kalbī
- Influenced: Yaqut al-Hamawi, Tabari, Al-Masudi, Ibn Sa'd

Abu al-Mundhir Hisham ibn Muhammad ibn al-Sa'ib ibn Bishr al-Kalbi (أبو المنذر هشام بن محمد بن السائب بن بشر بن عمرو بن الحارث بن عبد الحارث الكلبي; 737–819 CE / 204 AH), more commonly known as Hishām ibn al-Kalbī (Arabic: هشام بن الكلبي) and as Ibn al-Kalbi (ابن الكلبي), was an early 8th-century Arab Muslim historian. Born in Kufa, he spent much of his life in Baghdad. Like his father, he collected information about the genealogies and history of the ancient Arabs. His genealogies are well-cited among Arabs, but Sunni scholars considered his hadith to be unreliable since he was Shia. Much of his work was preserved by al-Tabari.

Ibn al-Kalbi's most famous work is the Book of Idols (Kitab al-Asnam), which aims to document the veneration of idols and pagan sanctuaries in different regions and among different tribes in pre-Islamic Arabia. In this work, Hisham posited a genealogical link between Ishmael and the Islamic prophet Muhammad and his progeny, and put forth the idea that all Arabs were descended from Ishmael. He relied heavily on the ancient oral traditions of the Arabs, but also quoted writers who had access to Biblical and Palmyrene sources. Hisham is also famous for preserving Abu Mikhnaf's work Maqtal al-Husayn (Alaihissalaam) ("The Murder place of Imam al-Husayn" ) which detailed the events of the Battle of Karbala in 680 based on eyewitness accounts, and was in turn preserved by al-Tabari. According to the Fihrist of Ibn al-Nadim, he wrote 140 works. His account of the genealogies of the Arabs is continually quoted in the Kitab al-Aghani. He also wrote the Strain of Horses (Ansab al-Khayl), which tries to document the history of the Arabian horse from 3000 BC to his own time.

== Scholarship ==
In 1966, Werner Caskel compiled a two volume study of Ibn al-Kalbi's Jamharat al-Nasab ("The Abundance of Kinship") entitled Das genealogische Werk des Hisam Ibn Muhammad al Kalbi ("The Genealogical Works of Hisham ibn Muhammad al-Kalbi"). It contains a prosopographic register of every individual mentioned in the genealogy in addition to more than three hundred genealogical tables based on the contents of the text.

== Works ==
- The Book of Idols (Kitab Al-Asnam)
- The Abundance of Genealogy/Kinship (Jamharat Al-Ansab)
- The Strain of Horses (Ansab al-Khayl)
- Three lost writings about the city of Al-Hira, the former Lakhmid capital
