= Phylarch =

Ancient military and leadership title

A phylarch (Greek: φύλαρχος, Latin: phylarchus) is a Greek title meaning "ruler of a tribe", from phyle, "tribe" + archein "to rule".

== Athens ==
In Classical Athens, a phylarch was the elected commander of the cavalry provided by each of the city's ten tribes.

In 442/441 BC, during the cavalry reforms initiated by Pericles, each of these tribal groups was authorised to levy a cavalry unit (phyle) of 100 citizens. Each was led by a phylarch, who in turn reported to two hipparchoi commanding the entire cavalry force. Both levels of officer were appointed by an electoral process carried out each year.

As citizen auxiliaries to the regular Athenian cavalry, detachments of mounted archers were employed. These were also commanded by phylarch leaders.

Athenian citizens provided their own equipment and clothing for military service and there is no evidence of required uniform items for any ranks. However there are literary references in drama to individual phylarch and other officers wearing pilos helmets or crimson cloaks.

== Subsequent eras ==
During the Hellenistic period, the term had its literal meaning as head of a tribe. It seemed to apply to Arabs who commanded tribes, essentially the equivalent to "sheikh". This usage continued in the later Roman Empire of the 4th to 7th centuries, where the title was given to the leading princes of the Empire's Arab allies in the East, both those settled within the Empire and outside. From ca. 530 to ca. 585, the individual phylarchs were subordinated to a supreme phylarch from the Ghassanid dynasty.

In Thomas More's Utopia (1516), leaders of Utopian cities are called phylarchs.
