= Werner Caskel =

German historian

Werner Caskel (March 5, 1896, Danzig – January 28, 1970, Cologne) was a German historian of Muslim people. Caskel's specialties were Islamic history and tribal genealogy.

He taught as professor at the University of Berlin (since 1946), University of Cologne (since 1948).

== Literary works ==
- Arabic inscriptions, 1936
- Die Beduinen (with Max von Oppenheim), 2 vols., 1939-1944
- Kalbī, Hišām Ibn-Muḥammad al-: Ǧamharat an-nasab, 2 vols., 1966
