= Irfan Shahîd =

American scholar in Oriental studies (1926–2016)

Irfan Arif Shahîd
- عرفان عارف شهيد
- Born: Irfan Arif Kawar; January 15, 1926; Nazareth, Mandatory Palestine
- Died: November 9, 2016 (aged 90); Washington, D.C., United States
- Citizenship: American
- Education: St John's College, Oxford (BA); Princeton University (PhD)
- Occupation: Professor

Irfan Arif Shahîd (Arabic: عرفان عارف شهيد ʿIrfān ʿĀrif Shahīd; January 15, 1926 – November 9, 2016), also known as Erfan Arif Kawar (عرفان عارف قعوار ʿIrfān ʿĀrif Qaʿwār), was an American professor and scholar in the field of Oriental studies. Between 1982 and 2016, he was the Oman Professor of Arabic and Islamic Literature at Georgetown University. Shahîd also became a Fellow of the Medieval Academy of America in 2012.

== Biography ==
Shahîd was born in Nazareth, Mandatory Palestine, to a family of Palestinian Christians. He left in 1946 to attend St John's College, Oxford, where he studied classics and Greco-Roman history under the renowned British historian A. N. Sherwin-White.

He received his PhD from Princeton University in Arabic and Islamic Studies. His doctorate thesis was "Early Islam and Poetry" and his research was primarily focused on three major areas: the area where the Greco-Roman world, especially the Byzantine Empire, meets the Arabic and Islamic worlds in the late antique and medieval times; Islamic studies, particularly the Quran; and Arabic literature, especially classical and medieval Arabic poetry.

== Selected works ==
- Rome and the Arabs: A Prolegomenon to the Study of Byzantium and the Arabs, 1984
- Byzantium and the Arabs in The Fourth Century, 1984
- Byzantium and the Arabs in the Fifth Century, 1989
- Byzantium and the Arabs in the Sixth Century, Volume 1, part 1, 1995
- Byzantium and the Arabs in the Sixth Century, Volume 1, part 2, 1995
- Byzantium and the Arabs in the Sixth Century, Volume 2, Part 1, 2002
- Byzantium and the Arabs in the Sixth Century, Volume 2, Part 2, 2010
- Byzantium and the Semitic Orient Before the Rise of Islam (Collected Studies Series: No.Cs270), 1988
- Omar Khayyám, the Philosopher-Poet of Medieval Islam, 1982
- Shahîd, Irfan (1971). The Martyrs of Najran - New Documents. Bruxelles, Belgium: Société des Bollandistes.
