= Humayd ibn Hurayth ibn Bahdal =

Ḥumayd ibn Ḥurayth al-Kalbī حميد بن حريث بن بهدل الكلبي
- Relatives: Bahdal ibn Unayf (grandfather); Yazid I (cousin); Hassan ibn Malik (cousin); Sa'id ibn Malik (cousin); Hurayth ibn Bahdal (father); Malik ibn Bahdal (uncle); Maysun bint Bahdal (aunt)
- Military career
- Allegiance: Umayyad Caliphate
- Service years: 683–693
- Rank: Head of Security Forces
- Conflicts: Second Fitna; Battle of Marj Rahit; Battle of Khazir; Qays–Yaman war

Humayd ibn Hurayth ibn Bahdal al-Kalbi (Arabic: حميد بن حريث بن بحدل الكلبي, romanized: Ḥumayd ibn Ḥurayth ibn Baḥdal al-Kalbī; fl. 683 – 693) was a senior Umayyad commander and a chieftain of the Banu Kalb tribe. He was head of the shurṭa (security forces) under caliphs Marwan I and Abd al-Malik, and may have served in the same capacity under their predecessor Caliph Yazid I. He commanded the Kalbi-dominated shurṭa in the Battle of Khazir in 686, and a year later joined the rebellion of the Umayyad prince Amr ibn Sa'id ibn al-As against Abd al-Malik. After the revolt's failure, Humayd reconciled with the latter. In the years following the battles of Marj Rahit (684) and Khazir, Humayd led the Kalb in numerous tit-for-tat raids and battles with enemy Qaysi tribes, including the Banu Amir, Banu Sulaym and Fazara.

== Family ==
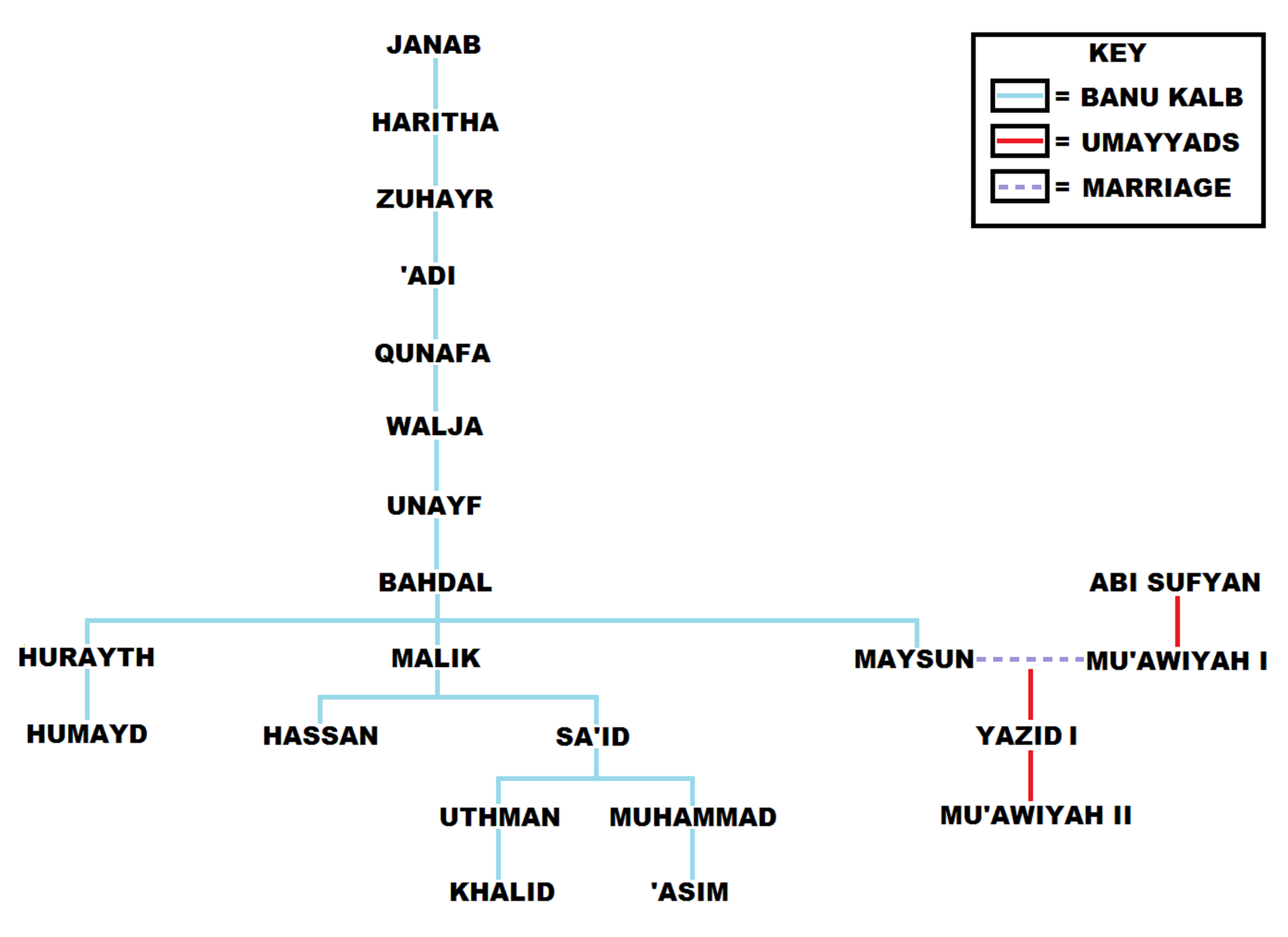
Family tree of Humayd ibn Hurayth al-Kalbi

Humayd ibn Hurayth was a grandson of Bahdal ibn Unayf, the preeminent chieftain of the Banu Kalb tribe. Humayd's family and tribe had kinship ties with the early Umayyad caliphs Mu'awiya I (r. 661–680), Yazid I (r. 680–683) and Mu'awiya II (r. 683–684) and gained influential positions in the Umayyad state. Humayd's cousins Hassan ibn Malik and Sa'id ibn Malik served as the governors of various Syrian ajnad (military districts) during the reigns of the aforementioned caliphs.

== Career ==
=== Head of security forces ===
According to medieval historian Ibn Habib, Humayd succeeded Yazid ibn al-Hurr al-Ansi as Caliph Yazid I's ṣāḥib al-shurṭa (head of security forces), a senior Umayyad governmental post; the shurṭa served a dual role as the military division that guarded the caliph in battle and the police force of the capital city, in this case Damascus. However, most medieval Muslim accounts hold that Yazid ibn al-Hurr died just before Caliph Yazid's reign. Moreover, there are no indications that Humayd served Caliph Yazid in any capacity. However, Humayd is described as the ṣāḥib al-shurṭa of Caliph Marwan I (r. 684–685) and continued this role under Caliph Abd al-Malik during the Battle of Khazir in 686; at the time, the shurṭa was dominated by Humayd's Kalbi tribesmen.

=== Feuds with Qays ===
The Kalb were the major component of the pro-Umayyad coalition that routed the pro-Zubayrid Qaysi tribes at the Battle of Marj Rahit in 684. In the blood feuds that occurred between Kalb and Qays in the following years, the Kalb were led by Humayd. In general, Humayd's attacks against the Qays were in response to raids by Zufar ibn al-Harith al-Kilabi of the Banu Amir and Umayr ibn al-Hubab al-Sulami of the Banu Sulaym. The latter was an Umayyad commander whose defection during the Battle of Khazir was blamed for the Umayyads' defeat there.

The first counter-raid Humayd led was an attack on Palmyra that killed sixty tribesmen of Banu Numayr, a branch of the Amir. This was in retaliation to a raid by the end Amir against Musaiyakh in the Samawah (desert between Iraq and Syria), that killed twenty Kalbi tribesmen Later, after 686, the Qays under Umayr launched a day-long assault that killed between 500 and 1,000 Kalbi tribesmen at Iqlil in Samawah. Humayd attempted but failed to capture Umayr as they withdrew to their headquarters in al-Qarqisiyah. In another attack by Umayr against the Samawah settlement of Ka'aba, Humayd barely escaped on his horse. After this, Humayd and his tribesmen temporarily evacuated from the Samawah to dwell in the Jordan Valley in Palestine.

=== Revolt and reconciliation with Abd al-Malik ===
In 687, Humayd joined the rebel Umayyad prince Amr ibn Sa'id ibn al-As who seized Damascus and claimed the caliphal throne from Abd al-Malik while the latter was on a military campaign in Jazira. When Abd al-Malik reached Damascus and clashed with Amr's forces, the latter dispatched Humayd as head of his cavalry and another Kalbi, Zuhayr ibn al-Abrad al-Kalbi. In response, Abd al-Malik sent out Humayd's cousin Hassan ibn Malik and Zuhayr's brother Sufyan to confront them. According to a report cited by medieval historian al-Tabari, the two sides fought for an extended period until the women of the Kalb tribe intervened with their children and appealed to Humayd and Sufyan not to kill each other for the sake of the Umayyad family; after another standoff, Humayd ultimately relented and withdrew to Damascus.

Amr was later defeated and executed, but Humayd and Abd al-Malik reconciled. In 689, Abd al-Malik dispatched Humayd, along with Kurayb ibn Abraha Abu Rishdin, to Constantinople to negotiate a treaty with the Byzantine emperor Justinian II.

=== Feuds with Fazara ===
By 691, Abd al-Malik conquered Zubayrid-held Iraq and made peace with Zufar, while Umayr had been slain by the Taghlib, an allied tribe of the Banu Kalb. Though Abd al-Malik's arrangements with the Amir and Sulaym precluded further retaliation against them by the Kalb, Humayd decided to avenge his tribe's past losses on another Qaysi tribe, the Fazara. The latter were based in Medina's eastern countryside and had not taken part in the Qaysi–Kalbi war, but by dint of their tribal affiliation and possible assistance to the Amir and Sulaym, they became an alternative target for Humayd. The latter obtained a government warrant to collect the cattle tax from the Fazara, which he used as a cover for a punitive expedition. With a massive Kalbi coalition consisting of the Ulaym and Abd Wadd clans, Humayd led assaults that killed and wounded numerous Fazari tribesmen, particularly at a place called Ah. In retaliation, the Fazara killed nearly seventy Kalbi tribesmen at Banat Qayn in the Samawah c. 693.

== Bibliography ==
- Crone, Patricia (1980). Slaves on Horses: The Evolution of the Islamic Polity. Cambridge and New York: Cambridge University Press. ISBN 0-521-52940-9.
- Donner, Fred (1989). "The Shurta in Early Umayyad Syria". In Bakhit, Muhammad Adnan; Schick, Robert (eds.). The Fourth International Conference on the History of Bilād al-Shām during the Umayyad Period: Proceedings of the Third Symposium, Volume 2. University of Jordan Press, Bilad al-Sham History Committee.
- Kennedy, Hugh (2001). The Armies of the Caliphs: Military and Society in the Early Islamic State. Routledge. ISBN 0-415-25092-7.
- Wellhausen, Julius (1927). The Arab Kingdom and its Fall. Translated by Margaret Graham Weir. Calcutta: University of Calcutta. OCLC 752790641.
- Fishbein, Michael, ed. (1990). The History of al-Ṭabarī, Volume XXI: The Victory of the Marwānids, A.D. 685–693/A.H. 66–73. SUNY Series in Near Eastern Studies. Albany, New York: State University of New York Press. ISBN 978-0-7914-0221-4.
