= Sa'id ibn Malik ibn Bahdal =

Sa'id ibn Malik ibn Bahdal was the governor of Jund Qinnasrin (military district of northern Syria) under the Umayyad caliphs Yazid I (r. 680–683) and Mu'awiya II (r. 683–684). During the Second Muslim Civil War, in 683 or 684, Sa'id was expelled from Qinnasrin by Zufar ibn al-Harith al-Kilabi, whose tribal faction, the Qays, rivals of Sa'id's tribe, the Banu Kalb, dominated the district. Zufar objected to a Kalbite controlling Qinnasrin and supported the claims of the anti-Umayyad claimant to the caliphate, Ibn al-Zubayr.

== Family ==
Sa'id was a cousin of Caliph Yazid I, the latter's mother Maysun being the sister of Sa'id's father Malik. They belonged to the influential house of Bahdal ibn Unayf, the chief of the Banu Kalb tribe in Syria. Sa'id's brother Hassan and cousin Humayd ibn Hurayth ibn Bahdal played leading roles in support of the Umayyads during the serious challenge to their rule in the Second Muslim Civil War.

Sa'id's grandson, Khalid ibn Uthman ibn Sa'id was the head of the shurta (select troops) of the Umayyad caliph al-Walid II (r. 743–744) and in that capacity, fought against his fellow Kalbites who opposed the caliph. Another descendant, Asim ibn Muhammad, was a leader of the Yaman tribal faction, to which the Kalb belonged, against its rival, the Qays, in Damascus during the reign of the Abbasid caliph Harun al-Rashid (r. 786–809).

== Bibliography ==
- Caskel, Werner (1966). Ğamharat an-nasab: Das genealogische Werk des His̆ām ibn Muḥammad al-Kalbī, Volume II (in German). Leiden: Brill.
- Crone, Patricia (1980). Slaves on Horses: The Evolution of the Islamic Polity. Cambridge: Cambridge University Press. ISBN 0-521-52940-9.
