= Bahdal ibn Unayf al-Kalbi =

- Died: c. mid-650s
- Known for: Chieftain of Banu Kalb (first half of 7th century)
- Children: Hurayth; Malik; Maysun (daughter)
- Father: Unayf ibn Dalja
- Family: Yazid I (grandson); Hassan ibn Malik (grandson); Sa'id ibn Malik (grandson); Humayd ibn Hurayth (grandson)

Bahdal ibn Unayf al-Kalbi (Arabic: بحدل بن أنيف الكلبي, romanized: Baḥdal ibn ʿUnayf al-Kalbī; died c. 650s) was the preeminent chief of the Banu Kalb tribe during early Muslim rule in Syria until his death in the mid-650s. A Christian like most of his tribesmen at the time, Bahdal secured a prominent role for his family and the Banu Kalb by marrying off his daughter Maysun to the future caliph Mu'awiya I (r. 661–680), while the latter was governor of Syria between 639 and 661. Maysun became mother to Mu'awiya's son and successor, Yazid I (r. 680–683). Though Bahdal died before 657, his forging of ties with the Umayyads secured his descendants and tribesmen the most prominent positions in the Umayyad court and military, so much so that partisans of the Umayyads became known as Baḥdaliyya. Bahdal's grandchildren led the Yaman faction in the wars with Qays, a rival tribal confederation.

== Life ==
Bahdal belonged to the Banu Kalb's princely household, the Banu Haritha ibn Janab, and served as the tribe's preeminent chieftain. Bahdal's full name and genealogy was as follows Bahdal ibn Unayf ibn Dalja ibn Qunafa ibn Adi He and his Bedouin tribesmen inhabited the steppes between Palmyra and Damascus by the time of the Muslim conquest of Syria in the 630s. The Banu Kalb was among the largest tribes in Syria and commanded the wider Quda'a confederation. (Note: The Quda'a was a large Bedouin confederation in Syria grouping together the tribes of Kalb, Tanukh, Khawlan, Banu al-Qayn and Bahra'.)

Though he was a Christian like most of the Banu Kalb, Bahdal forged ties with the Muslim rulers of Syria, namely from the Umayyad clan. He married off his daughter Maysun to Mu'awiya I, a member of the clan and governor of Islamic Syria. According to the historians Henri Lammens and Patricia Crone, Bahdal derived his prominence from this marriage, though he did not play a political role himself. It is not known when Bahdal was born, but he died at an old age in the mid-650s, likely before the Battle of Siffin between the partisans of the Umayyads and Caliph Ali in 657. He died a Christian, and at least one of his sons and two of his daughters also remained Christians.

== Legacy ==
At the Battle of Siffin, Bahdal's grandson, Hassan ibn Malik, fought for Mu'awiya and commanded the Quda'a contingent. The Umayyads triumphed over their rivals and Mu'awiya became caliph in 661, moving the capital of the caliphate from Medina to Damascus. By dint of his marital links with Mu'awiya, Bahdal became "the founder of the great prosperity of the Kalbites" during Umayyad rule (661–750), according to Lammens. His household's influence with the early Umayyad caliphs was such that partisans of the Umayyads were known as the Baḥdaliyya. Mu'awiya's son and successor Yazid I (r. 680–683) was a grandson of Bahdal. Meanwhile, Hassan, his brother Sa'id and another of Bahdal's grandsons, Humayd ibn Hurayth, went on to play major roles in the Umayyad administration and military, serving as governors of various Syrian provinces, commanders of military and police units and holders of high-ranking positions in the courts of caliphs Yazid I, Mu'awiya II (r. 683–684), Marwan I (684–685) and Abd al-Malik (r. 685–705). Afterward, the family largely disappeared from the historical record, though members occasionally appeared as military commanders or tribal leaders until the reign of Abbasid caliph Harun al-Rashid (r. 786–809).

Family and genealogy of Bahdal ibn Unayf

Janab
Haritha
Zuhayr
Adi
Qunafa
Dalja
Unayf
Bahdal
Hurayth | Malik | Maysun | Mu'awiya I (r. 661–680)
Humayd | Hassan | Sa'id | Yazid I (r. 680–683) | Kalbite woman
Uthman | Muhammad | Mu'awiya II (r. 683–684)
Khalid | Asim

Caliphs from the Umayyad dynasty

== Bibliography ==
- Caskel, Werner (1966). Ğamharat an-nasab: Das genealogische Werk des His̆ām ibn Muḥammad al-Kalbī, Volume II (in German). Leiden: Brill.
- Crone, Patricia (1980). Slaves on Horses: The Evolution of the Islamic Polity (1980 ed.). Cambridge: Cambridge University Press. ISBN 978-0521229616.
- Lammens, Henri (1960). "Baḥdal". In Gibb, H. A. R.; Kramers, J. H.; Lévi-Provençal, E.; Schacht, J.; Lewis, B. & Pellat, Ch. (eds.). The Encyclopaedia of Islam, Second Edition. Volume I: A–B. Leiden: E. J. Brill. pp. 919–920. OCLC 495469456.
- Kister, M. J. (1986). "Kuḍāʿa". In Bosworth, C. E.; van Donzel, E.; Lewis, B. & Pellat, Ch. (eds.). The Encyclopaedia of Islam, Second Edition. Volume V: Khe–Mahi. Leiden: E. J. Brill. pp. 315–318. ISBN 978-90-04-07819-2.
- Marsham, Andrew (2013). "The Architecture of Allegiance in Early Islamic Late Antiquity: The Accession of Mu'awiya in Jerusalem, ca 661 CE". In Beihammer, Alexander; Constaninou, Stavroula; Parani, Maria (eds.). Court Ceremonies and Rituals of Power in Byzantium and the Medieval Mediterranean: Comparative Perspectives. Leiden: Brill. ISBN 978-90-04-25686-6.
- Morony, Michael G., ed. (1987). The History of al-Ṭabarī, Volume XVIII: Between Civil Wars: The Caliphate of Muʿāwiyah, 661–680 A.D./A.H. 40–60. SUNY Series in Near Eastern Studies. Albany, New York: State University of New York Press. ISBN 978-0-87395-933-9.
