= Mu'awiya I =

Founder of the Umayyad Caliphate

Mu'awiya I معاوية
- Amir al-Mu'minin; Khalifat Allah
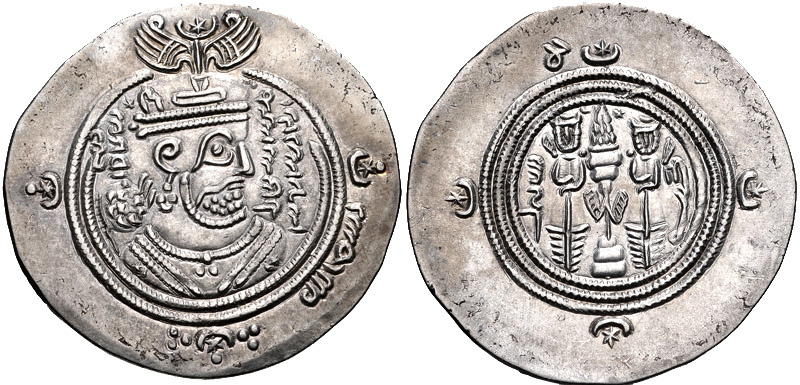
- Sasanian-style silver dirham minted in Mu'awiya's name, c. 674 The obverse side shows the portrait of the Sasanian shah Khosrow II (r. 590–628) and his name in the Pahlavi script.

1st Caliph of the Umayyad Caliphate
- Reign: January 661 – April 680
- Predecessor: Position established; Hasan ibn Ali (as caliph)
- Successor: Yazid I

Governor of Syria
- In office 639–661
- Preceded by: Yazid ibn Abi Sufyan
- Succeeded by: Position abolished
- Born: c. 597–605; Mecca, Hejaz, Arabia
- Died: April 680 (aged c. 75–83); Damascus, Umayyad Caliphate
- Burial: Bab al-Saghir, Damascus
- Spouse: Katwa bint Qurayza al-Nawfaliyya; Fakhita bint Qurayza al-Nawfaliyya; Maysun bint Bahdal al-Kalbiyya; Na'ila bint Umara al-Kalbiyya; Quraiba al-Sughra bint Abi Umayya al-Makhzumiya
- Issue: Yazid; Abd Allah; Ramla
- House: Sufyanid
- Dynasty: Umayyad
- Father: Abu Sufyan ibn Harb
- Mother: Hind bint Utba
- Religion: Islam

Mu'awiya ibn Abi Sufyan (Note: Arabic: معاوية بن أبي سفيان, romanized: Muʿāwiya ibn Abī Sufyān) (c. 597, 603 or 605 – April 680), commonly known as Mu'awiya I, was the founder of the Umayyad Caliphate, ruling as the first caliph of the Umayyad dynasty from 661 until his death in 680. He became caliph less than thirty years after the death of the Islamic prophet Muhammad and immediately after the four Rashidun ('rightly-guided') caliphs. Unlike his predecessors, who had been close, early companions of Muhammad, Mu'awiya was a relatively late follower of Muhammad.

Mu'awiya and his father Abu Sufyan had opposed Muhammad, their distant Qurayshite kinsman and later Mu'awiya's brother-in-law, until Muhammad captured Mecca in 630. Afterwards, Mu'awiya became one of Muhammad's scribes. He was appointed by Caliph Abu Bakr (r. 632–634) as a deputy commander in the conquest of Syria. He moved up the ranks through Umar's caliphate (r. 634–644) until becoming governor of Syria during the reign of his Umayyad kinsman, Caliph Uthman (r. 644–656). He allied with the province's powerful Banu Kalb tribe, developed the defenses of its coastal cities, and directed the war effort against the Byzantine Empire, including the first Muslim naval campaigns.

In response to Uthman's assassination in 656, Mu'awiya took up the cause of avenging the murdered caliph and opposed the election of Ali. During the First Fitna, the two led their armies to a stalemate at the Battle of Siffin in 657, prompting an abortive series of arbitration talks to settle the dispute. Afterward, Mu'awiya gained recognition as caliph by his Syrian supporters and his ally Amr ibn al-As, who conquered Egypt from Ali's governor in 658. Following the assassination of Ali in 661, Mu'awiya compelled Ali's son and successor Hasan to abdicate and Mu'awiya's suzerainty was acknowledged throughout the Caliphate.

Domestically, Mu'awiya relied on Syria's loyalist Arab tribes and largely Christian bureaucracy. He is credited with establishing government departments responsible for the postal route, correspondence, and chancellery. He was the first caliph whose name appeared on coins or documents of the nascent Islamic empire. Externally, he engaged his troops in almost yearly land and sea raids against the Byzantines, culminating in a siege of Constantinople. In Iraq and the eastern provinces, he delegated authority to the powerful governors al-Mughira and Ziyad ibn Abihi, the latter of whom he controversially claimed as his brother. Under Mu'awiya's direction, the Muslim conquest of Ifriqiya (central North Africa) was launched by the commander Uqba ibn Nafi in 670, while the conquests in Khurasan and Sijistan on the eastern frontier were resumed.

Although Mu'awiya confined the influence of his Umayyad clan to the governorship of Medina, he nominated his own son Yazid I as his successor, making the caliphate hereditary. It was an unprecedented move in Islamic politics and opposition to it by prominent Muslim leaders, including Ali's son Husayn, and Abd Allah ibn al-Zubayr, persisted after Mu'awiya's death, culminating with the outbreak of the Second Fitna. While there is considerable admiration for Mu'awiya in the contemporary sources, he has been criticized for lacking the justice and piety of the Rashidun and transforming the office of the caliphate into a kingship. Nevertheless, Sunni Muslims honor him as a companion of Muhammad and a scribe of Quranic revelation. In Shia Islam, Mu'awiya is reviled for opposing Ali, accused of poisoning his son Hasan, and held to have accepted Islam without conviction.

== Origins and early life ==
Expansion of the caliphate: Maximum territorial extent of the First Islamic State by the time of Muhammad's death in 632 (green). Maximum territorial extent of the Rashidun Caliphate (brown). Maximum territorial extent of the Umayyad Caliphate (yellow)

Mu'awiya's year of birth is uncertain, with 597, 603 or 605 cited by early Islamic sources. His father Abu Sufyan ibn Harb was a prominent Meccan merchant who led trade caravans to Byzantine Syria. He emerged as the leader of the Banu Abd Shams clan of the polytheistic Quraysh, the dominant tribe of Mecca, during the early stages of the Quraysh's conflict with the Islamic prophet Muhammad. The latter also hailed from the Quraysh and was distantly related to Mu'awiya via their common paternal ancestor, Abd Manaf ibn Qusayy. Mu'awiya's mother, Hind bint Utba, was also a member of the Banu Abd Shams.

In 624, Muhammad and his followers attempted to intercept a Meccan caravan led by Mu'awiya's father on its return from Syria, prompting Abu Sufyan to call for reinforcements. The Qurayshite relief army was routed in the ensuing Battle of Badr, in which Mu'awiya's elder brother Hanzala and their maternal grandfather, Utba ibn Rabi'a, were killed. Abu Sufyan replaced the slain leader of the Meccan army, Amr ibn Hisham, and led the Meccans to victory against the Muslims at the Battle of Uhud in 625, a battle in which Mu'awiya also participated. After his abortive siege of Muhammad in Medina at the Battle of the Trench in 627, Abu Sufyan lost his leadership position among the Quraysh.

Mu'awiya's father was not a participant in the truce negotiations at Hudaybiyya between the Quraysh and Muhammad in 628. The following year, Muhammad married Mu'awiya's widowed sister Umm Habiba, who had embraced Islam fifteen years earlier. The marriage may have reduced Abu Sufyan's hostility toward Muhammad and Abu Sufyan negotiated with him in Medina in 630 after confederates of the Quraysh violated the Hudaybiyya truce. When Muhammad captured Mecca in 630, Mu'awiya, his father, and his elder brother Yazid embraced Islam. According to accounts cited by the early Muslim historians al-Baladhuri and Ibn Hajar, Mu'awiya had secretly become a Muslim from the time of the Hudaybiyya negotiations. By 632 Muslim authority extended across Arabia with Medina as the seat of the Muslim government. As part of Muhammad's efforts to reconcile with the Quraysh, Mu'awiya was made one of his kātibs (scribes), being one of seventeen literate members of the Quraysh at that time. Abu Sufyan moved to Medina to maintain his newfound influence in the nascent Muslim community.

== Governorship of Syria ==
=== Early military career and administrative promotions ===
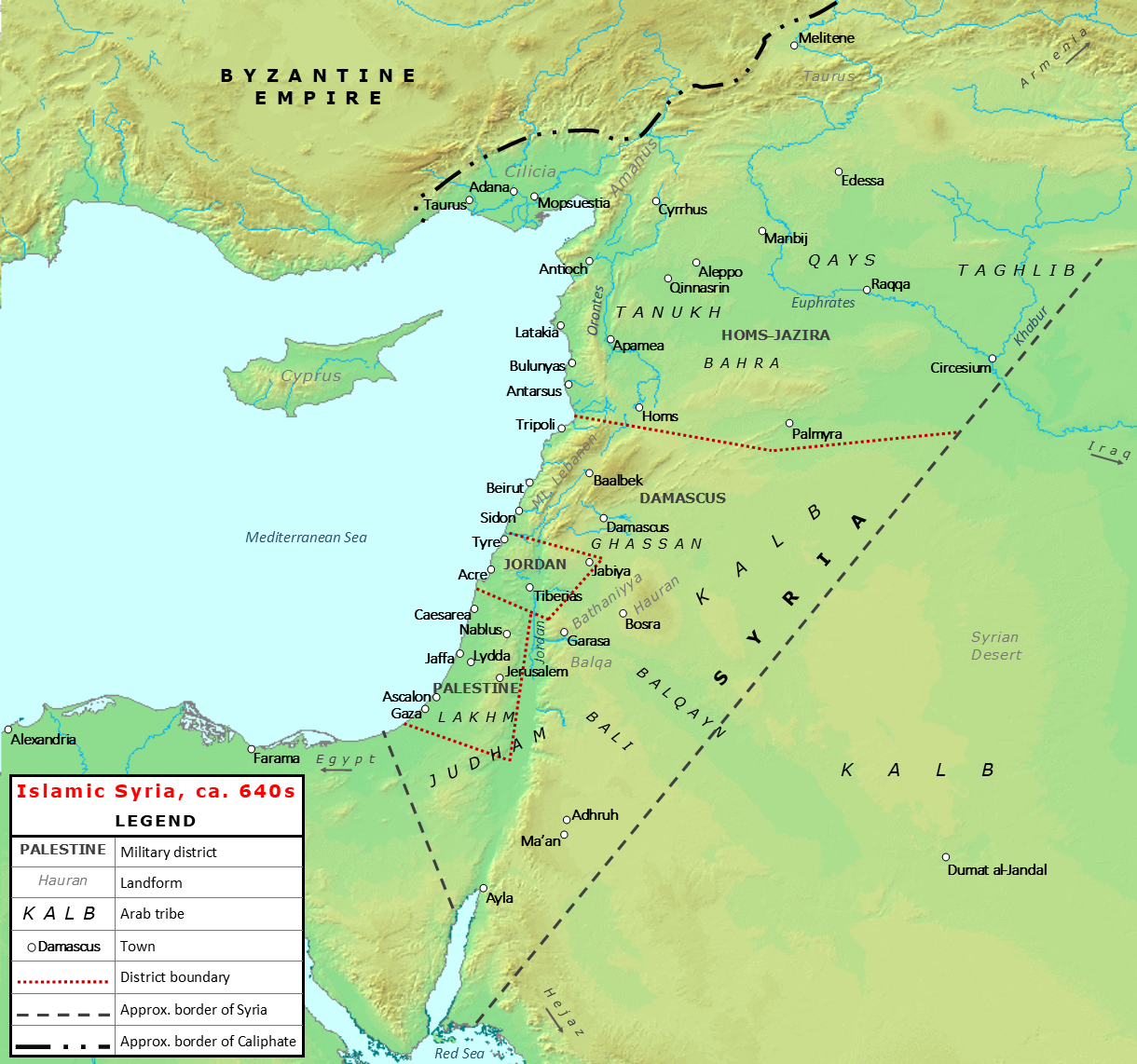
Map of the region of Syria in the first decades of Islamic rule

After Muhammad died in 632, Abu Bakr became caliph (leader of the Muslim community). He and his successors Umar, Uthman, and Ali are often known as the Rashidun ('rightly-guided') caliphs to distinguish them from Mu'awiya and his Umayyad dynastic successors. Having to contend with challenges to his leadership from the Ansar, the natives of Medina who had provided Muhammad safe haven from his erstwhile Meccan opponents, and the mass defections of several Arab tribes, Abu Bakr reached out to the Quraysh, particularly its two strongest clans, the Banu Makhzum and Banu Abd Shams, to shore up support for the Caliphate. Among those Qurayshites whom he appointed to suppress the rebel Arab tribes during the Ridda Wars (632–633) was Mu'awiya's brother Yazid. After that war, Yazid was dispatched as one of four commanders in charge of the Muslim conquest of Byzantine Syria in c. 634. The caliph appointed Mu'awiya commander of Yazid's vanguard. Through these appointments Abu Bakr gave the family of Abu Sufyan a stake in the conquest of Syria, where Abu Sufyan already owned property in the vicinity of Damascus. (Note: According to al-Baladhuri, Abu Sufyan owned a village in the Balqa region, which formed part of the Damascus district. The 13th-century Syrian geographer Yaqut al-Hamawi identified it as a village called Biqinis.)

Abu Bakr's successor Umar (r. 634–644) appointed a leading companion of Muhammad, Abu Ubayda ibn al-Jarrah, as the general commander of the Muslim army in Syria in 636 after the rout of the Byzantines at the Battle of the Yarmuk, which paved the way for the conquest of the rest of Syria. Mu'awiya was among the Arab troops who entered Jerusalem with Caliph Umar in 637. (Note: Mu'awiya is probably the 'Mu'awiya' mentioned as the 'writer' in an Arabic inscription, apparently dated to 652, excavated at the southwestern section of the Temple Mount in 1968. The inscription consists of nine lines, only few of which are legible, that the historian Moshe Sharon tentatively concludes relate to the capitulation of Jerusalem to the Muslims c. 637. Abu Ubayda ibn al-Jarrah and Abd al-Rahman ibn Awf, two other companions of Muhammad who reports in the early Islamic sources connect to the city's conquest, are mentioned as witnesses. The date of the inscription is several years after Abu Ubayda's death and roughly corresponds with the death of Abd al-Rahman, but coincides with the governorship of Mu'awiya, who was a scribe. Sharon thus surmises the inscription was a legal document written by Mu'awiya to commemorate the surrender.) Afterward, Mu'awiya and Yazid were dispatched by Abu Ubayda to conquer the coastal towns of Sidon, Beirut and Byblos. Following the death of Abu Ubayda in the plague of Amwas in 639, Umar split the command of Syria, appointing Yazid as governor of the military districts of Damascus, Jordan and Palestine, and the veteran commander Iyad ibn Ghanm governor of Homs and the Jazira (Upper Mesopotamia). When Yazid succumbed to the plague later that year, Umar appointed Mu'awiya the military and fiscal governor of Damascus, and possibly Jordan as well. In 640 or 641, Mu'awiya captured Caesarea, the district capital of Byzantine Palestine, and then captured Ascalon, completing the Muslim conquest of Palestine. As early as 640 or 641, Mu'awiya may have led a campaign against Cilicia and proceeded to Euchaita, deep in Byzantine Anatolia. In 644, he led a foray against the Anatolian city of Amorium.

The successive promotions of Abu Sufyan's sons contradicted Umar's efforts to otherwise curtail the influence of the Qurayshite aristocracy in the Muslim state in favor of the earliest Muslim converts (i.e. the Muhajirun and Ansar groups). According to the historian Leone Caetani, this exceptional treatment stemmed from Umar's personal respect for the Umayyads, the branch of the Banu Abd Shams to which Mu'awiya belonged. This is doubted by the historian Wilferd Madelung, who surmises that Umar had little choice, due to the lack of a suitable alternative to Mu'awiya in Syria and the ongoing plague in the region, which precluded the deployment of commanders more preferable to Umar from Medina.

Upon the accession of Caliph Uthman (r. 644–656), Mu'awiya's governorship was enlarged to include Palestine, while a companion of Muhammad, Umayr ibn Sa'd al-Ansari, was confirmed as governor of the Homs-Jazira district. In late 646 or early 647, Uthman attached the Homs-Jazira district to Mu'awiya's Syrian governorship, greatly increasing the military manpower at his disposal.

=== Consolidation of local power ===
During the reign of Uthman, Mu'awiya allied with the Banu Kalb, the predominant tribe in the Syrian steppe extending from the oasis of Dumat al-Jandal in the south to the approaches of Palmyra. The Kalb was also the chief component of the Quda'a confederation, which was present throughout Syria. Medina consistently courted the Kalb, which had remained mostly neutral during the Arab–Byzantine wars, particularly after the central government's entreaties to the Byzantines' principal Arab allies, the Christian Ghassanids, were rebuffed. (Note: According to the historian Khalil Athamina, Caliph Umar's efforts to make the native Syrian Arab tribes the foundation of Syria's defense from a Byzantine counterattack was the main cause of Khalid ibn al-Walid's dismissal from the general command in Syria and the subsequent recall to Iraq of the numerous tribesmen in Khalid's army, who were likely perceived as a threat by the Banu Kalb and its allies, in 636. The Quraysh and the early Muslim elite sought to secure Syria, with which they had long been acquainted, for themselves and encouraged the nomadic Arab late converts among the Muslim troops to immigrate to Iraq. According to Madelung, Umar may have promoted Yazid and Mu'awiya as guarantors of the Caliphate's authority in Syria against the growing "strength and high ambitions" of the South Arabian, aristocratic Himyarites, who had played a prominent role in the Muslim conquest.) Before the advent of Islam in Syria, the Kalb and the Quda'a, long under the influence of Greco-Aramaic culture and the Monophysite church, had served Byzantium as subordinates of its Ghassanid client kings to guard the Syrian frontier against invasions by the Sasanian Persians and the latter's Arab clients, the Lakhmids. By the time the Muslims entered Syria, the Kalb and the Quda'a had accumulated significant military experience and were accustomed to hierarchical order and military obedience. To harness their strength and thereby secure his foothold in Syria, Mu'awiya consolidated ties to the Kalb's ruling house, the clan of Bahdal ibn Unayf, by marrying the latter's daughter Maysun in c. 650. He also married Maysun's Kalbite cousin, Na'ila bint Umara, for a short period. (Note: Na'ila bint Umara hailed from a different clan of the Banu Kalb, the Banu Amir al-Akbar; Mu'awiya's first Kalbite wife, Maysun bint Bahdal, belonged to the tribe's preeminent clan, the Banu Haritha ibn Janab. After Mu'awiya divorced Na'ila bint Umara, she was wed to Mu'awiya's close aide Habib ibn Maslama al-Fihri and after the latter's death, to another of Mu'awiya's close aides, Nu'man ibn Bashir al-Ansari.)

Mu'awiya's reliance on the native Syrian Arab tribes was compounded by the heavy toll inflicted on the Muslim troops in Syria by the plague of Amwas, which caused troop numbers to dwindle from 24,000 in 637 to 4,000 in 639. Moreover, the focus of Arabian tribal migration was toward the Sasanian front in Iraq. Mu'awiya oversaw a liberal recruitment policy that resulted in considerable numbers of Christian tribesmen and frontier peasants filling the ranks of his regular and auxiliary forces. Indeed, the Christian Tanukhids and the mixed Muslim–Christian Banu Tayy formed part of Mu'awiya's army in northern Syria. To help pay for his troops, Mu'awiya requested and was granted ownership by Uthman of the abundant, income-producing, Byzantine crown lands in Syria, which were previously designated by Umar as communal property for the Muslim army.

Although Syria's rural, Aramaic-speaking Christian population remained largely intact, the Muslim conquest had caused a mass flight of Greek Christian urbanites from Damascus, Aleppo, Latakia and Tripoli to Byzantine territory, while those who remained held pro-Byzantine sympathies. In contrast to the other conquered regions of the Caliphate, where new garrison cities were established to house Muslim troops and their administration, in Syria the troops settled in existing cities, including Damascus, Homs, Jerusalem, Tiberias, Aleppo and Qinnasrin. Mu'awiya restored, repopulated and garrisoned the coastal cities of Antioch, Balda, Tartus, Maraclea and Baniyas. In Tripoli he settled significant numbers of Jews, while sending to Homs, Antioch and Baalbek Persian holdovers from the Sasanian occupation of Byzantine Syria in the early 7th century. Upon Uthman's direction, Mu'awiya settled groups of the nomadic Tamim, Asad and Qays tribes to areas north of the Euphrates in the vicinity of Raqqa.

=== Naval campaigns against Byzantium and conquest of Armenia ===
Mu'awiya initiated the Arab naval campaigns against the Byzantines in the eastern Mediterranean, requisitioning the harbors of Tripoli, Beirut, Tyre, Acre, and Jaffa. Umar had rejected Mu'awiya's request to launch a naval invasion of Cyprus, citing concerns about the Muslim forces' safety at sea, but Uthman allowed him to commence the campaign in 647, after refusing an earlier entreaty. Mu'awiya's rationale was that the Byzantine-held island posed a threat to Arab positions along the Syrian coast, and that it could be easily neutralized. The exact year of the raid is unclear, with the early Arabic sources providing a range between 647 and 650, while two Greek inscriptions in the Cypriot village of Solois cite two raids launched between 648 and 650.

According to the 9th-century historians al-Baladhuri and Khalifa ibn Khayyat, Mu'awiya led the raid in person accompanied by his wife, Katwa bint Qaraza ibn Abd Amr of the Qurayshite Banu Nawfal, alongside the commander Ubadah ibn al-Samit. Katwa died on the island and at some point Mu'awiya married her sister Fakhita. In a different narrative by the early Muslim sources, the raid was instead conducted by Mu'awiya's admiral Abdallah ibn Qais, who landed at Salamis before occupying the island. In either case, the Cypriots were forced to pay a tribute equal to that which they had paid the Byzantines. Mu'awiya established a garrison and a mosque to maintain the Caliphate's influence on the island, which became a staging ground for the Arabs and the Byzantines to launch raids against each other's territories. The inhabitants of Cyprus were largely left to their own devices and archaeological evidence indicates uninterrupted prosperity during this period.

Dominance of the eastern Mediterranean enabled Mu'awiya's naval forces to raid Crete and Rhodes in 653. From the raid on Rhodes, Mu'awiya remitted significant war spoils to Uthman. In 654 or 655, a joint naval expedition launched from Alexandria, Egypt and the harbors of Syria routed a Byzantine fleet commanded by Emperor Constans II (r. 641–668) off the Lycian coast at the Battle of the Masts. Constans II was forced to sail to Sicily, opening the way for an unsuccessful Arab naval attack on Constantinople. The Arabs were either commanded by the governor of Egypt, Abd Allah ibn Abi Sarh, or Mu'awiya's lieutenant Abu al-A'war.

Meanwhile, after two previous attempts by the Arabs to conquer Armenia, the third attempt in 650 ended with a three-year truce reached between Mu'awiya and the Byzantine envoy Procopios in Damascus. In 653, Mu'awiya received the submission of the Armenian leader Theodore Rshtuni, which the Byzantine emperor practically conceded when he withdrew from Armenia that year. In 655, Mu'awiya's lieutenant commander Habib ibn Maslama al-Fihri captured Theodosiopolis and deported Rshtuni to Syria, solidifying Arab rule over Armenia.

== First Fitna ==
Mu'awiya's domain was generally immune to the growing discontent prevailing in Medina, Egypt and Kufa against Uthman's policies in the 650s. The exception was Abu Dharr al-Ghifari, who had been sent to Damascus for openly condemning Uthman's enrichment of his kinsmen. He criticized the lavish sums that Mu'awiya invested in building his Damascus residence, the Khadra Palace, prompting Mu'awiya to expel him. Uthman's confiscation of crown lands in Iraq and his alleged nepotism (Note: Uthman's efforts to maintain Qurayshite control over the Caliphate and assert control over the loose financial system of Umar, saw the appointment of his close relatives from the Banu Umayya and its parent clan the Banu Abd Shams to all of the Caliphate's major governorships. These provincial appointments included Syria and the Jazira under his Umayyad cousin Mu'awiya, Kufa successively under the Umayyads al-Walid ibn Uqba and Sa'id ibn al-As, Basra with Bahrayn and Oman under Uthman's maternal cousin Abd Allah ibn Amir of the Banu Abd Shams, and Egypt under Uthman's foster brother Abd Allah ibn Abi Sarh. He also relied on his Umayyad cousin Marwan ibn al-Hakam in his internal decision-making. Uthman demanded that the surplus revenue from the conquered lands, which had been declared state property by Umar but remained under the control of the conquering tribesmen, be forwarded to Medina. He also made land grants to his relatives and other prominent Qurayshites.) drove the Quraysh and the dispossessed elites of Kufa and Egypt to oppose the caliph.

Uthman sent for assistance from Mu'awiya when rebels from Egypt besieged his home in June 656. Mu'awiya dispatched a relief army toward Medina, but it withdrew at Wadi al-Qura when word reached them of Uthman's killing. Ali, Muhammad's cousin and son-in-law, was recognized as caliph in Medina. Mu'awiya withheld allegiance to Ali and, according to some reports, the latter deposed him by sending his own governor to Syria, who was denied entry into the province by Mu'awiya. This is rejected by Madelung, according to whom no formal relations existed between the caliph and the governor of Syria for seven months from the date of Ali's election.

Soon after becoming caliph, Ali was opposed by much of the Quraysh led by Zubayr and Talha, both prominent companions of Muhammad, and Muhammad's wife Aisha, who feared the loss of their own influence under Ali. The ensuing civil war became known as the First Fitna. (Note: Historically, the term fitna came to mean a civil war or rebellion which causes rifts in the unified Muslim community and endangers believers' faith.) Ali defeated the triumvirate near Basra at the Battle of the Camel, which ended in the deaths of Zubayr and Talha, both potential contenders for the caliphate, and the retirement of Aisha to Medina. With his position in Iraq, Egypt and Arabia secure, Ali turned his attention toward Mu'awiya. Unlike the other provincial governors, Mu'awiya had a strong and loyal power base, demanded revenge for the slaying of his Umayyad kinsman Uthman, and could not be easily replaced. At this point, Mu'awiya did not yet claim the caliphate and his principal aim was keeping power in Syria.

=== Preparations for war ===
Ali's victory in Basra left Mu'awiya vulnerable, his territory wedged between Ali's forces in Iraq and Egypt, while the war with the Byzantines was ongoing in the north. In 657 or 658 Mu'awiya secured his northern frontier with Byzantium by making a truce with the emperor, enabling him to focus the bulk of his troops on the impending battle with the caliph. After failing to gain the defection of Egypt's governor, Qays ibn Sa'd, he resolved to end the Umayyad family's hostility to Amr ibn al-As, the conqueror and former governor of Egypt, whom they accused of involvement in Uthman's death. Mu'awiya and Amr, who was popular with the Arab troops of Egypt, made a pact whereby the latter joined the coalition against Ali and Mu'awiya publicly agreed to install Amr as Egypt's lifetime governor should they oust Ali's appointee.

Although he had the firm backing of the Kalb, to shore up the rest of his base in Syria, Mu'awiya was advised by his kinsman al-Walid ibn Uqba to secure an alliance with the Yemenite tribes of Himyar, Kinda and Hamdan, who collectively dominated the Homs garrison. He employed the veteran commander and Kindite nobleman Shurahbil ibn Simt, who was widely respected in Syria, to rally the Yemenites to his side. He then enlisted support from the dominant tribal leader of Palestine, the Judham chief Natil ibn Qays, by allowing the latter's confiscation of the district's treasury to go unpunished. The efforts bore fruit and demands for war against Ali grew throughout Mu'awiya's domain. When Ali sent his envoy, the veteran commander and chieftain of the Bajila, Jarir ibn Abd Allah, to Mu'awiya, the latter responded with a letter that amounted to a declaration of war against the caliph, whose legitimacy he refused to recognize.

=== Battle of Siffin and arbitration ===
In the first week of June 657, the armies of Mu'awiya and Ali met at Siffin near Raqqa and engaged in days of skirmishes interrupted by a month-long truce on 19 June. During the truce, Mu'awiya dispatched an embassy led by Habib ibn Maslama, who presented Ali with an ultimatum to hand over Uthman's alleged killers, abdicate and allow a shura (consultative council) to decide the caliphate. Ali rebuffed Mu'awiya's envoys and on 18 July declared that the Syrians remained obstinate in their refusal to recognize his sovereignty. On the following day, a week of duels between Ali's and Mu'awiya's top commanders ensued. The main battle between the two armies commenced on 26 July. As Ali's troops advanced toward Mu'awiya's tent, Mu'awiya ordered his elite troops forward and they bested the Iraqis before the tide turned against the Syrians the next day with the deaths of two of Mu'awiya's leading commanders, Ubayd Allah, a son of Caliph Umar, and Dhu l-Kala' Samayfa ibn Nakur, the so-called 'king of Himyar'.

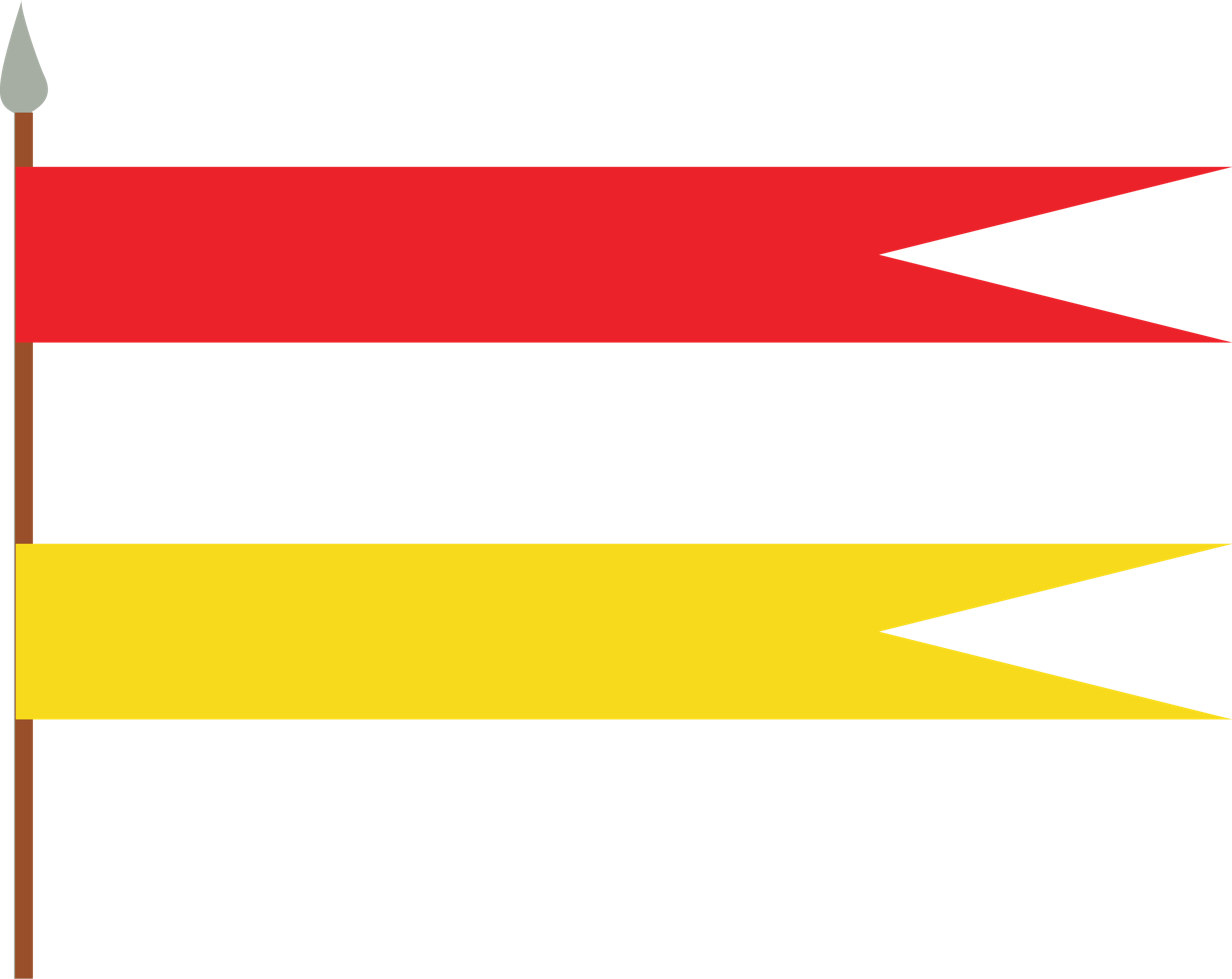
The standard (liwa) of Mu'awiya at the Battle of Siffin

Mu'awiya rejected suggestions from his advisers to engage Ali in a duel and definitively end hostilities. The battle climaxed on the so-called 'Night of Clamor' on 28 July, which saw Ali's forces take the advantage in a melée as the death toll mounted on both sides. (Note: The consensus in the early Muslim sources holds that Caliph Ali's Iraqi forces gained the advantage during the battle prompting the Syrians to appeal for a settlement by arbitration. This is contrasted by a number of early non-Muslim sources, including Theophanes the Confessor, according to whom the Syrians were victorious, an assertion supported by Umayyad court poetry.) According to the account of the scholar al-Zuhri (d. 742), this prompted Amr ibn al-As to counsel Mu'awiya the following morning to have a number of his men tie leaves of the Qur'an on their lances in an appeal to the Iraqis to settle the conflict through consultation. According to the scholar al-Sha'bi (d. 723), al-Ash'ath ibn Qays, who was in Ali's army, expressed his fears of Byzantine and Persian attacks were the Muslims to exhaust themselves in the civil war. Upon receiving intelligence of this, Mu'awiya ordered the raising of the Qur'an leaves. Though this act represented a surrender of sorts as Mu'awiya abandoned, at least temporarily, his previous insistence on settling the dispute with Ali militarily and pursuing Uthman's killers into Iraq, it had the effect of sowing discord and uncertainty in Ali's ranks.

The caliph adhered to the will of the majority in his army and accepted the proposal to arbitrate. Moreover, Ali agreed to Amr's, or Mu'awiya's, demand to omit his formal title, amir al-mu'minin (commander of the faithful, the traditional title of a caliph), from the initial arbitration document. According to the historian Hugh N. Kennedy, the agreement forced Ali "to deal with Mu'awiya on equal terms and abandon his unchallenged right to lead the community". Madelung asserts it "handed Mu'awiya a moral victory" before inducing a "disastrous split in the ranks of Ali's men". Indeed, upon Ali's return to his capital Kufa in September 658, a large segment of his troops who had opposed the arbitration defected, inaugurating the Kharijite movement.

The initial agreement postponed the arbitration to a later date. Information in the early Muslim sources about the time, place and outcome of the arbitration is contradictory, but there were likely two meetings between Mu'awiya's and Ali's respective representatives, Amr and Abu Musa al-Ash'ari, the first in Dumat al-Jandal and the last in Adhruh. Ali abandoned the arbitration after the first meeting in which Abu Musa—who, unlike Amr, was not particularly attached to his principal's cause— accepted the Syrian side's claim that Uthman was wrongfully killed, a verdict that Ali opposed. The final meeting in Adhruh, which had been convened at Mu'awiya's request, collapsed, but by then Mu'awiya had emerged as a major contender for the caliphate.

=== Claim to the caliphate and resumption of hostilities ===
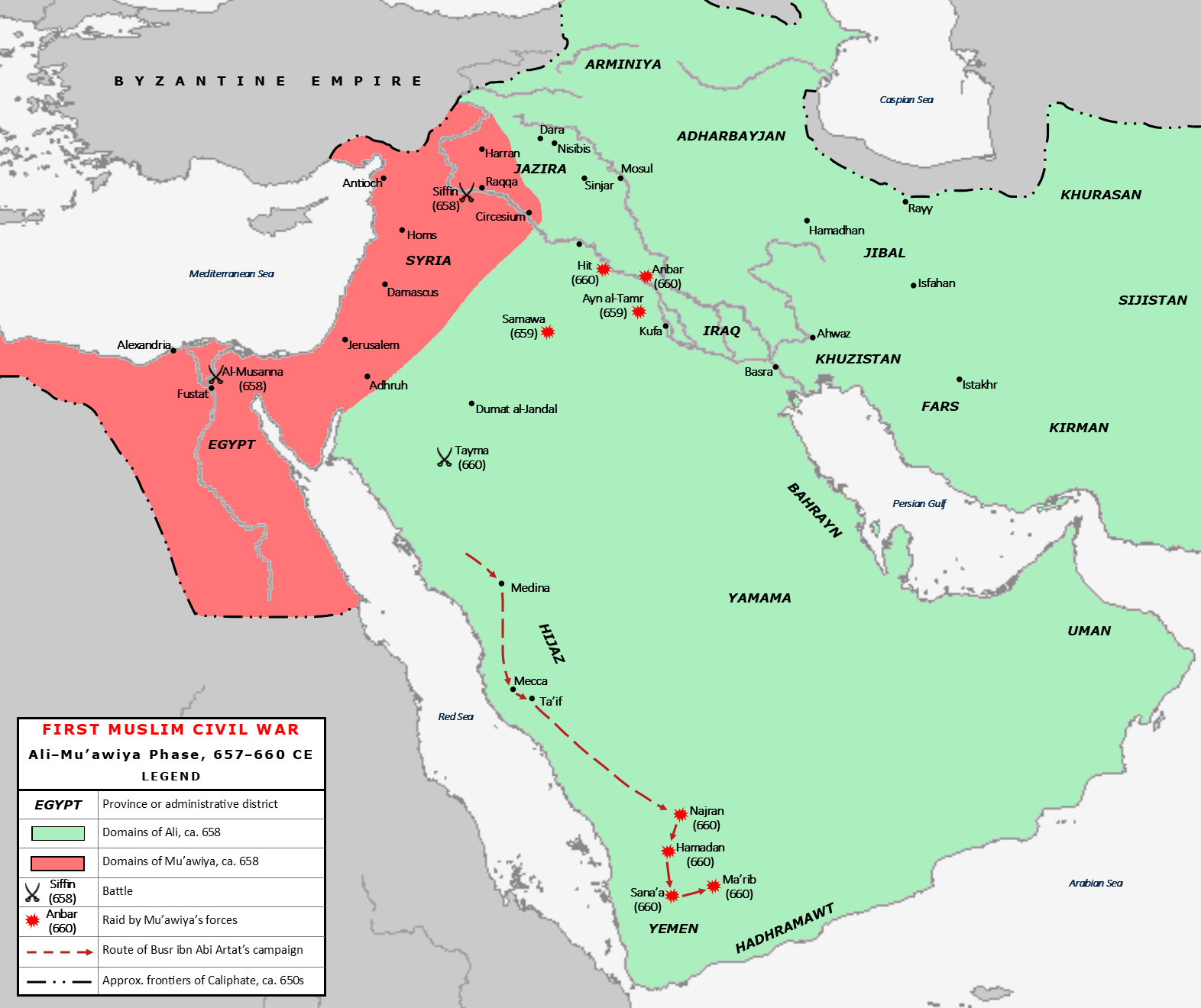
Map of the First Fitna. The areas shaded in green, namely the regions of Iraq, Arabia, Persia and the Caucasus, and pink, namely the regions of Syria and Egypt, respectively represent the territories under Caliph Ali's and Mu'awiya's control in 658.

Following the breakdown of the arbitration talks, Amr and the Syrian delegates returned to Damascus, where they greeted Mu'awiya as amir al-mu'minin, signaling their recognition of him as caliph. In April or May 658, Mu'awiya received the pledge of allegiance from the Syrians. In response, Ali broke off communications with Mu'awiya, mobilized for war and invoked a curse against Mu'awiya and his close retinue as a ritual in the morning prayers. Mu'awiya reciprocated in kind against Ali and his closest supporters in his own domain.

In July, Mu'awiya dispatched a Syrian army under Amr to Egypt after a request for military intervention from the Uthmaniyya (Note: The Uthmaniyya were a faction that demanded vengeance for Caliph Uthman's assassination and rejected Ali's caliphate, holding him or his supporters responsible for Uthman's death.) in the province who were being suppressed by Ali's governor, Muhammad ibn Abi Bakr. The latter's troops were defeated by Amr's forces, the provincial capital Fustat was captured and Muhammad was executed on the orders of Mu'awiya ibn Hudayj, the leader of the Egyptian Uthmaniyya. The loss of Egypt was a major blow to the authority of Ali, who was bogged down battling Kharijite defectors in Iraq and whose grip in Basra and Iraq's eastern and southern dependencies was eroding. Though his hand was strengthened, Mu'awiya refrained from launching a direct assault against Ali. Instead, his strategy was to bribe the tribal chieftains in Ali's army to his side and harry the remaining territories under Ali's control. The first raid was conducted by al-Dahhak ibn Qays al-Fihri against the desert west of Kufa. This was followed by Nu'man ibn Bashir's abortive attack on Ayn al-Tamr, then in the summer of 660, Sufyan ibn Awf's successful raids against Hit and Anbar.

In 659 or 660, Mu'awiya expanded the operations to the Hejaz (western Arabia, where Mecca and Medina are located), sending Abd Allah ibn Mas'ada al-Fazari to collect the alms tax and oaths of allegiance to Mu'awiya from the inhabitants of the Tayma oasis. This initial foray was defeated by the Kufans, while an attempt to extract oaths of allegiance from the Quraysh of Mecca in April 660 also failed. In the summer, Mu'awiya dispatched a large army under Busr ibn Abi Artat to conquer the Hejaz and Yemen. He directed Busr to intimidate Medina's inhabitants without harming them, spare the Meccans and execute anyone in Yemen who refused to pledge their allegiance. Busr advanced through Medina, Mecca and Taif, encountering no resistance and gaining those cities' recognition of Mu'awiya. In Yemen, Busr killed several notables in Najran and its vicinity on account of past criticism of Uthman or ties to Ali, as well as numerous tribesmen of the Hamdan and townspeople from Sanaa and Marib. Before he could continue his campaign in Hadhramawt, he withdrew upon the approach of a Kufan relief force. News of Busr's actions in Arabia spurred Ali's troops to rally behind his planned campaign against Mu'awiya, but the expedition was aborted as a result of Ali's assassination by a Kharijite dissident in January 661.

== Caliphate ==
=== Accession ===
After Ali was killed, Mu'awiya left al-Dahhak ibn Qays in charge of Syria and led his army toward Kufa, where Ali's son Hasan had been nominated as his successor. He successfully bribed Ubayd Allah ibn Abbas, the commander of Hasan's vanguard, to desert his post and sent envoys to negotiate with Hasan. In return for a financial settlement, Hasan abdicated the caliphate to Mu'awiya, who entered Kufa in July or September 661 and received the pledge of allegiance from the Iraqis. This year is considered by a number of the early Muslim sources as 'the year of unity' and is generally regarded as the start of Mu'awiya's caliphate.

Before and/or after Ali's death, Mu'awiya received oaths of allegiance in one or two formal ceremonies in Jerusalem, the first in late 660 or early 661 and the second in July 661. The 10th-century Jerusalemite geographer al-Maqdisi holds that Mu'awiya had further developed a mosque originally built by Caliph Umar on the Temple Mount, the precursor of the Al-Aqsa Mosque, and received his formal oaths of allegiance there. According to the earliest extant source about Mu'awiya's accession in Jerusalem, the near-contemporary Maronite Chronicle, composed by an anonymous Syriac author, Mu'awiya received the pledges of the tribal chieftains and then prayed at Golgotha and the Tomb of the Virgin Mary in Gethsemane, both adjacent to the Temple Mount. The Maronite Chronicle also maintains that Mu'awiya "did not wear a crown like other kings in the world".

=== Domestic rule and administration ===
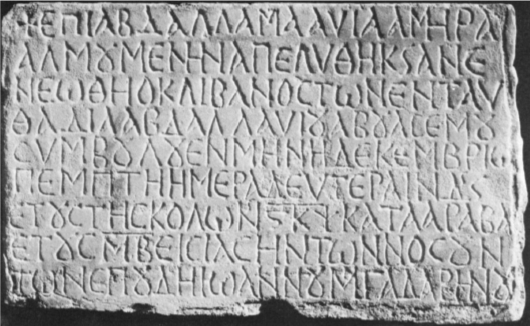
A Greek inscription crediting Mu'awiya for restoring the Roman-era bath facilities at Hamat Gader in 663, the sole epigraphic attestation of Mu'awiya's rule in Syria, the center of his caliphate

There is little information in the early Muslim sources about Mu'awiya's rule in Syria, the center of his caliphate. He established his court in Damascus and moved the caliphal treasury there from Kufa. He relied on his Syrian tribal soldiery, numbering about 100,000 men, increasing their pay at the expense of the Iraqi garrisons, also about 100,000 soldiers combined. The highest stipends were paid on an inheritable basis to 2,000 nobles of the Quda'a and Kinda tribes, the core components of his support base, who were further awarded the privilege of consultation for all major decisions and the rights to veto or propose measures. The respective leaders of the Quda'a and the Kinda, the Kalbite chief Ibn Bahdal and the Homs-based Shurahbil, formed part of his Syrian inner circle along with the Qurayshites Abd al-Rahman ibn Khalid, the son of the famed general Khalid ibn al-Walid, and al-Dahhak ibn Qays, a chieftain of the Fihr clan who served as the commander of the caliph's security forces (shurta) and governor of Damascus.

Mu'awiya is credited by the early Muslim sources for establishing diwans (government departments) for correspondences (rasa'il), chancellery (khatam) and the postal route (barid). According to al-Tabari, following an assassination attempt by the Kharijite al-Burak ibn Abd Allah on Mu'awiya while he was praying in the mosque of Damascus in 661, Mu'awiya established a caliphal haras (personal guard) and shurta (select troops) and the maqsura (reserved area) within mosques. The caliph's treasury was largely dependent on the tax revenues of Syria and income from the crown lands that he confiscated in Iraq and Arabia. He also received the customary fifth of the war booty acquired by his commanders during expeditions. In the Jazira, Mu'awiya coped with the tribal influx, which spanned previously established groups such as the Sulaym, newcomers from the Mudar and Rabi'a confederations and civil war refugees from Kufa and Basra, by administratively detaching the military district of Qinnasrin–Jazira from Homs, according to the 8th-century historian Sayf ibn Umar. Al-Baladhuri attributes this change to Mu'awiya's successor Yazid I (r. 680–683).

Syria retained its Byzantine-era bureaucracy, which was staffed by Christians including the head of the tax administration, Sarjun ibn Mansur. The latter had served Mu'awiya in the same capacity before his attainment of the caliphate, and Sarjun's father was the likely holder of the office under Emperor Heraclius (r. 610–641). Mu'awiya was tolerant toward Syria's native Christian majority. In turn, the community was generally satisfied with his rule, under which their conditions were at least as favorable as under the Byzantines. Mu'awiya attempted to mint his own coins, but the new currency was rejected by the Syrians as it omitted the symbol of the cross. The sole epigraphic attestation to Mu'awiya's rule in Syria, a Greek inscription dated to 663 discovered at the hot springs of Hamat Gader near the Sea of Galilee, refers to the caliph as Abd Allah Mu'awiya, amir al-mu'minin ("God's Servant Mu'awiya, commander of the faithful"; the caliph's name is preceded by a cross) and credits him for restoring Roman-era bath facilities for the benefit of the sick. According to the historian Yizhar Hirschfeld, "by this deed, the new caliph sought to please" his Christian subjects. The caliph often spent his winters at his Sinnabra palace near the Sea of Galilee. Mu'awiya was also credited with ordering the restoration of Edessa's church after it was ruined in an earthquake in 679. He demonstrated a keen interest in Jerusalem. Although archaeological evidence is lacking, there are indications in medieval literary sources that a rudimentary mosque on the Temple Mount existed as early as Mu'awiya's time or was built by him. (Note: The Christian pilgrim Arculf visited Jerusalem between 679 and 681 and noted that a makeshift Muslim prayer house built of beams and clay with a capacity for 3,000 worshipers had been erected on the Temple Mount, while a Jewish midrash holds that Mu'awiya rebuilt the Temple Mount's walls. The mid-10th-century Arabic chronicler Ibn Tahir explicitly states that Mu'awiya built a mosque on the site.)

=== Governance in the provinces ===
Mu'awiya's primary internal challenge was overseeing a Syria-based government that could reunite the politically and socially fractured Caliphate and assert authority over the tribes which formed its armies. He applied indirect rule to the Caliphate's provinces, appointing governors with full civil and military authority. Although in principle governors were obliged to forward surplus tax revenues to the caliph, in practice most of the surplus was distributed among the provincial garrisons and Damascus received a negligible share. During Mu'awiya's caliphate, the governors relied on the ashraf (tribal chieftains), who served as intermediaries between the authorities and the tribesmen in the garrisons. Mu'awiya's statecraft was likely inspired by his father, who utilized his wealth to establish political alliances. The caliph generally preferred bribing his opponents over direct confrontation. In the summation of Kennedy, Mu'awiya ruled by "making agreements with those who held power in the provinces, by building up the power of those who were prepared to co-operate with him and by attaching as many important and influential figures to his cause as possible".

==== Iraq and the east ====
Challenges to central authority in general, and to Mu'awiya's rule in particular, were most acute in Iraq, where divisions were rife between the ashraf upstarts and the nascent Muslim elite, the latter of which was further divided between Ali's partisans and the Kharijites. Mu'awiya's ascent signaled the rise of the Kufan ashraf represented by Ali's erstwhile backers al-Ash'ath ibn Qays and Jarir ibn Abd Allah, at the expense of Ali's old guard represented by Hujr ibn Adi and Ibrahim, the son of Ali's leading aide Malik al-Ashtar. Mu'awiya's initial choice to govern Kufa in 661 was al-Mughira ibn Shu'ba, who possessed considerable administrative and military experience in Iraq and was highly familiar with the region's inhabitants and issues. Under his nearly decade-long administration, al-Mughira maintained peace in the city, overlooked transgressions that did not threaten his rule, allowed the Kufans to keep possession of the lucrative Sasanian crown lands in the Jibal district and, unlike under past administrations, consistently and timely paid the garrison's stipends.

In Basra, Mu'awiya reappointed his kinsman from the Abd Shams clan, Abd Allah ibn Amir, who had previously held the office under Caliph Uthman. During Mu'awiya's reign, Ibn Amir recommenced expeditions into Sistan, reaching as far as Kabul. He was unable to maintain order in Basra, where there was growing resentment toward the distant campaigns. Consequently, Mu'awiya replaced Ibn Amir with Ziyad ibn Abihi in 665. The latter had been the longest of Ali's loyalists to withhold recognition of Mu'awiya's caliphate and had barricaded himself in the Istakhr fortress in Fars. Busr had threatened to execute three of Ziyad's young sons in Basra to force his surrender, but Ziyad was ultimately persuaded by al-Mughira, his mentor, to submit to Mu'awiya's authority in 663. In a controversial step that secured the loyalty of the fatherless Ziyad, whom the caliph viewed as the most capable candidate to govern Basra, Mu'awiya adopted him as his paternal half-brother, to the protests of his own son Yazid, Ibn Amir and his Umayyad kinsmen in the Hejaz.

Following al-Mughira's death in 670, Mu'awiya attached Kufa and its dependencies to Ziyad's Basran governorship, making him the caliph's virtual viceroy over the eastern half of the Caliphate. Ziyad tackled Iraq's core economic problem of overpopulation in the garrison cities and the consequent scarcity of resources by reducing the number of troops on the payrolls and dispatching 50,000 Iraqi soldiers and their families to settle Khurasan. This also consolidated the previously weak and unstable Arab position in the Caliphate's easternmost province and enabled conquests toward Transoxiana. As part of his reorganization efforts in Kufa, Ziyad confiscated its garrison's crown lands, which thenceforth became the possession of the caliph. Opposition to the confiscations raised by Hujr ibn Adi, whose pro-Alid advocacy had been tolerated by al-Mughira, was violently suppressed by Ziyad. Hujr and his retinue were sent to Mu'awiya for punishment and were executed on the caliph's orders, marking the first political execution in Islamic history and serving as a harbinger for future pro-Alid uprisings in Kufa. Ziyad died in 673 and his son Ubayd Allah was appointed gradually by Mu'awiya to all of his father's former offices. In effect, by relying on al-Mughira and Ziyad and his sons, Mu'awiya franchised the administration of Iraq and the eastern Caliphate to members of the elite Thaqif clan, which had long-established ties to the Quraysh and were instrumental in the conquest of Iraq.

==== Egypt ====
In Egypt, Amr governed more as a partner of Mu'awiya than a subordinate until his death in 664. He was permitted to retain the surplus revenues of the province. The caliph ordered the resumption of Egyptian grain and oil shipments to Medina, ending the hiatus caused by the First Fitna. After Amr's death, Mu'awiya's brother Utba (r. 664–665) and an early companion of Muhammad, Uqba ibn Amir (r. 665–667), successively served as governors before Mu'awiya appointed Maslama ibn Mukhallad in 667. Maslama remained governor for the duration of Mu'awiya's reign, significantly expanding Fustat and its mosque and boosting the city's importance in 674 by relocating Egypt's main shipyard to the nearby Roda Island from Alexandria due to the latter's vulnerability to Byzantine naval raids.

The Arab presence in Egypt was mostly limited to the central garrison at Fustat and the smaller garrison at Alexandria. The influx of Syrian troops brought by Amr in 658 and the Basran troops sent by Ziyad in 673 swelled Fustat's 15,000-strong garrison to 40,000 during Mu'awiya's reign. Utba increased the Alexandria garrison to 12,000 men and built a governor's residence in the city, whose Greek Christian population was generally hostile to Arab rule. When Utba's deputy in Alexandria complained that his troops were unable to control the city, Mu'awiya deployed a further 15,000 soldiers from Syria and Medina. The troops in Egypt were far less rebellious than their Iraqi counterparts, though elements in the Fustat garrison occasionally raised opposition to Mu'awiya's policies, culminating during Maslama's term with the widespread protest at Mu'awiya's seizure and allotment of crown lands in Fayyum to his son Yazid, which compelled the caliph to reverse his order.

==== Arabia ====
Although revenge for Uthman's assassination had been the basis upon which Mu'awiya had claimed the caliphate, he neither emulated Uthman's empowerment of the Umayyad clan nor used them to assert his own power. With minor exceptions, members of the clan were not appointed to the wealthy provinces nor the caliph's court, Mu'awiya largely limiting their influence to Medina, the old capital of the Caliphate where most of the Umayyads and the wider Qurayshite former aristocracy remained headquartered. The loss of political power left the Umayyads of Medina resentful toward Mu'awiya, who may have become wary of the political ambitions of the much larger Abu al-As branch of the clan, to which Uthman had belonged, now under the leadership of Marwan ibn al-Hakam.

The caliph attempted to weaken the clan by provoking internal divisions. Among the measures taken was the replacement of Marwan from the governorship of Medina in 668 with another leading Umayyad, Sa'id ibn al-As. The latter was instructed to demolish Marwan's house, but refused and when Marwan was restored in 674, he also refused Mu'awiya's order to demolish Sa'id's house. Mu'awiya dismissed Marwan once more in 678, replacing him with his own nephew, al-Walid ibn Utba. Besides his own clan, Mu'awiya's relations with the Banu Hashim (the clan of Muhammad and Ali), the families of Muhammad's closest companions, the once-prominent Banu Makhzum, and the Ansar were generally characterized by suspicion or outright hostility.

Despite his relocation to Damascus, Mu'awiya remained fond of his original homeland and made known his longing for "the spring in Juddah [sic], the summer in Ta'if, [and] the winter in Mecca". He purchased several large tracts throughout Arabia and invested considerable sums to develop the lands for agricultural use. According to the Muslim literary tradition, in the plain of Arafat and the barren valley of Mecca he dug numerous wells and canals, constructed dams and dikes to protect the soil from seasonal floods, and built fountains and reservoirs. His efforts saw extensive grain fields and date palm groves spring up across Mecca's suburbs, which remained in this state until deteriorating during the Abbasid era, which began in 750. In the Yamama region in central Arabia, Mu'awiya confiscated from the Banu Hanifa the lands of Hadarim, where he employed 4,000 slaves, likely to cultivate its fields. The caliph gained possession of estates in and near Ta'if which, together with the lands of his brothers Anbasa and Utba, formed a considerable cluster of properties.

One of the earliest known Arabic inscriptions from Mu'awiya's reign was found at a soil-conservation dam called Sayisad 32 kilometers (20 mi) east of Ta'if, which credits Mu'awiya for the dam's construction in 677 or 678 and asks God to give him victory and strength. Mu'awiya is also credited as the patron of a second dam called al-Khanaq 15 kilometers (9.3 mi) east of Medina, according to an inscription found at the site. This is possibly the dam between Medina and the gold mines of the Banu Sulaym tribe attributed to Mu'awiya by the historians al-Harbi (d. 898) and al-Samhudi (d. 1533).

=== War with Byzantium ===
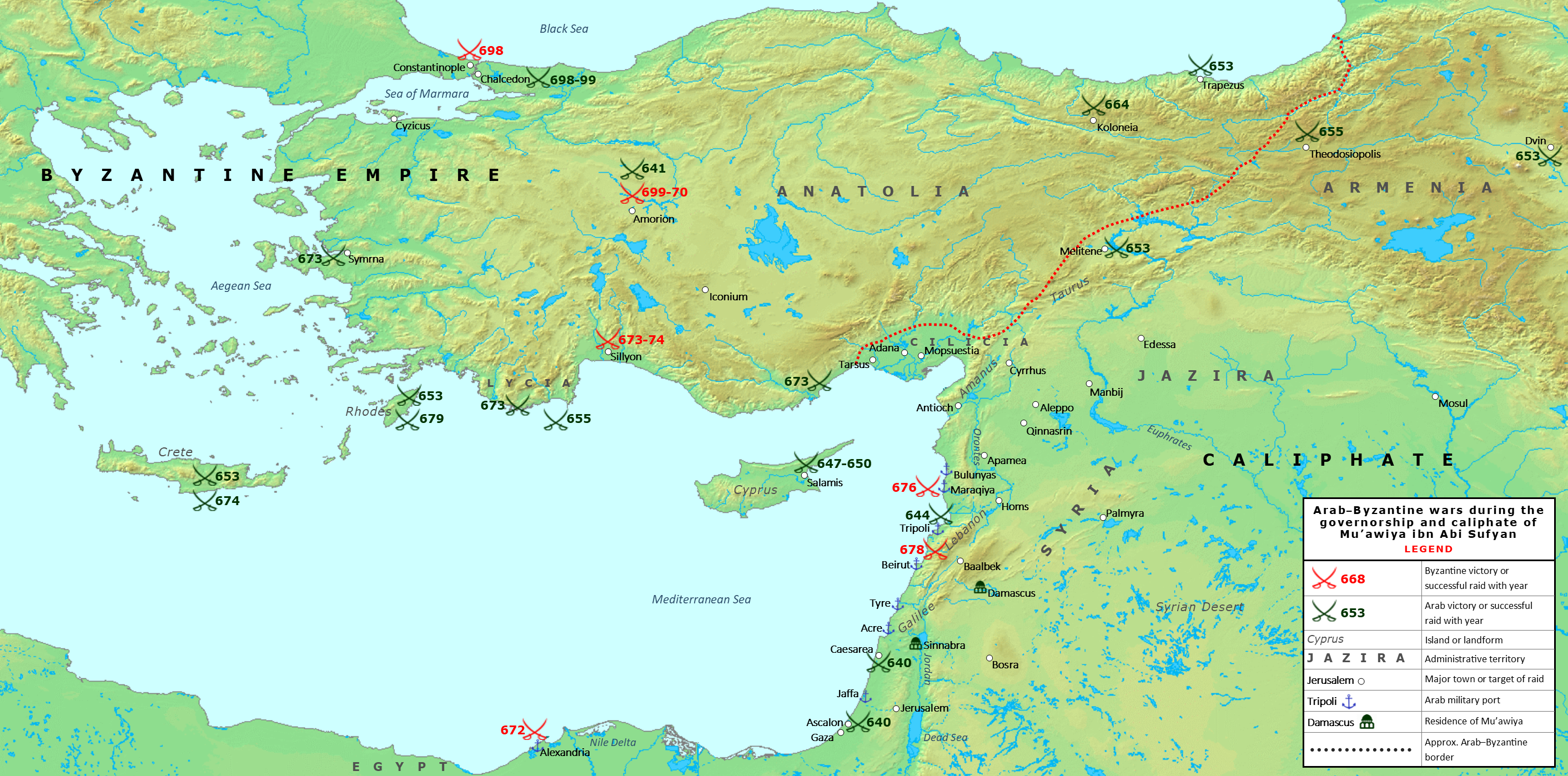
Map showing the raids, battles and naval engagements between the Arab Caliphate and Byzantine during Mu'awiya's governorship of Syria (640–661) and Mu'awiya's caliphate (661–680).

Mu'awiya possessed more personal experience than any other caliph fighting the Byzantines, the principal external threat to the Caliphate, and pursued the war against the Empire more energetically and continuously than his successors. The First Fitna caused the Arabs to lose control over Armenia to native, pro-Byzantine princes, but in 661 Habib ibn Maslama re-invaded the region. The following year, Armenia became a tributary of the Caliphate and Mu'awiya recognized the Armenian prince Grigor Mamikonian as its commander. Not long after the civil war, Mu'awiya broke the truce with Byzantium, and on a near-annual or bi-annual basis the caliph engaged his Syrian troops in raids across the mountainous Anatolian frontier, the buffer zone between the Empire and the Caliphate. At least until Abd al-Rahman ibn Khalid's death in 666, Homs served as the principal marshaling point for the offensives, and afterward Antioch served this purpose as well. The bulk of the troops fighting on the Anatolian and Armenian fronts hailed from the tribal groups that arrived from Arabia during and after the conquest. During his caliphate, Mu'awiya continued his past efforts to resettle and fortify the Syrian port cities. Due to the reticence of Arab tribesmen to inhabit the coastlands, in 663 Mu'awiya moved Persian civilians and personnel that he had previously settled in the Syrian interior into Acre and Tyre, and transferred Asawira, elite Persian soldiers, from Kufa and Basra to the garrison at Antioch. A few years later, Mu'awiya settled Apamea with 5,000 Slavs who had defected from the Byzantines during one of his forces' Anatolian campaigns.

Based on the histories of al-Tabari (d. 923) and Agapius of Hierapolis (d. 941), the first raid of Mu'awiya's caliphate occurred in 662 or 663, during which his forces inflicted a heavy defeat on a Byzantine army with numerous patricians slain. In the next year a raid led by Busr reached Constantinople and in 664 or 665, Abd al-Rahman ibn Khalid raided Koloneia in northeastern Anatolia. In the late 660s, Mu'awiya's forces attacked Antioch of Pisidia or Antioch of Isauria. Following the death of Constans II in July 668, Mu'awiya oversaw an increasingly aggressive policy of naval warfare against the Byzantines. According to the early Muslim sources, raids against the Byzantines peaked between 668 and 669. In each of those years there occurred six ground campaigns and a major naval campaign, the first by an Egyptian and Medinese fleet and the second by an Egyptian and Syrian fleet. The culmination of the campaigns was an assault on Constantinople, but the chronologies of the Arabic, Syriac, and Byzantine sources are contradictory. The traditional view by modern historians is of a great series of naval-borne assaults against Constantinople in c. 674–678, based on the history of the Byzantine chronicler Theophanes the Confessor (d. 818).

However, the dating and the very historicity of this view has been challenged; the Oxford scholar James Howard-Johnston considers that no siege of Constantinople took place, and that the story was inspired by the actual siege a generation later. The historian Marek Jankowiak on the other hand, in a revisionist reconstruction of the events reliant on the Arabic and Syriac sources, asserts that the assault came earlier than what is reported by Theophanes, and that the multitude of campaigns that were reported during 668–669 represented the coordinated efforts by Mu'awiya to conquer the Byzantine capital. Al-Tabari reports that Mu'awiya's son Yazid led a campaign against Constantinople in 669 and Ibn Abd al-Hakam reports that the Egyptian and Syrian navies joined the assault, led by Uqba ibn Amir and Fadala ibn Ubayd respectively. According to Jankowiak, Mu'awiya likely ordered the invasion during an opportunity presented by the rebellion of the Byzantine Armenian general Saborios, who formed a pact with the caliph, in spring 667. The caliph dispatched an army under Fadala, but before it could be joined by the Armenians, Saborios died. Mu'awiya then sent reinforcements led by Yazid who led the Arab army's invasion in the summer. An Arab fleet reached the Sea of Marmara by autumn, while Yazid and Fadala, having raided Chalcedon through the winter, besieged Constantinople in spring 668, but due to famine and disease, lifted the siege in late June. The Arabs continued their campaigns in Constantinople's vicinity before withdrawing to Syria most likely in late 669.

In 669, Mu'awiya's navy raided as far as Sicily. The following year, the wide-scale fortification of Alexandria was completed. While the histories of al-Tabari and al-Baladhuri report that Mu'awiya's forces captured Rhodes in 672–674 and colonized the island for seven years before withdrawing during the reign of Yazid I, the modern historian Clifford Edmund Bosworth casts doubt on these events and holds that the island was only raided by Mu'awiya's lieutenant Junada ibn Abi Umayya al-Azdi in 679 or 680. Under Emperor Constantine IV (r. 668–685), the Byzantines began a counteroffensive against the Caliphate, first raiding Egypt in 672 or 673, while in winter 673, Mu'awiya's admiral Abd Allah ibn Qays led a large fleet that raided Smyrna and the coasts of Cilicia and Lycia. The Byzantines landed a major victory against an Arab army and fleet led by Sufyan ibn Awf, possibly at Sillyon, in 673 or 674. The next year, Abd Allah ibn Qays and Fadala landed in Crete and in 675 or 676, a Byzantine fleet assaulted Maraclea, killing the governor of Homs.

In 677, 678 or 679, according to Theophanes, Mu'awiya sued for peace with Constantine IV, possibly as a result of the destruction of his fleet or the Byzantines' deployment of the Mardaites in the Syrian littoral during that time. A thirty-year treaty was concluded, obliging the Caliphate to pay an annual tribute of 3,000 gold coins, 50 horses and 30 slaves, and withdraw their troops from the forward bases they had occupied on the Byzantine coast. But other Byzantine and Islamic sources make no mention of this treaty. Although the Muslims did not achieve any permanent territorial gains in Anatolia during Mu'awiya's career, the frequent raids provided Mu'awiya's Syrian troops with war spoils and tribute, which helped ensure their continued allegiance, and sharpened their combat skills. Moreover, Mu'awiya's prestige was boosted and the Byzantines were precluded from any concerted campaigns against Syria.

==== Conquest of central North Africa ====
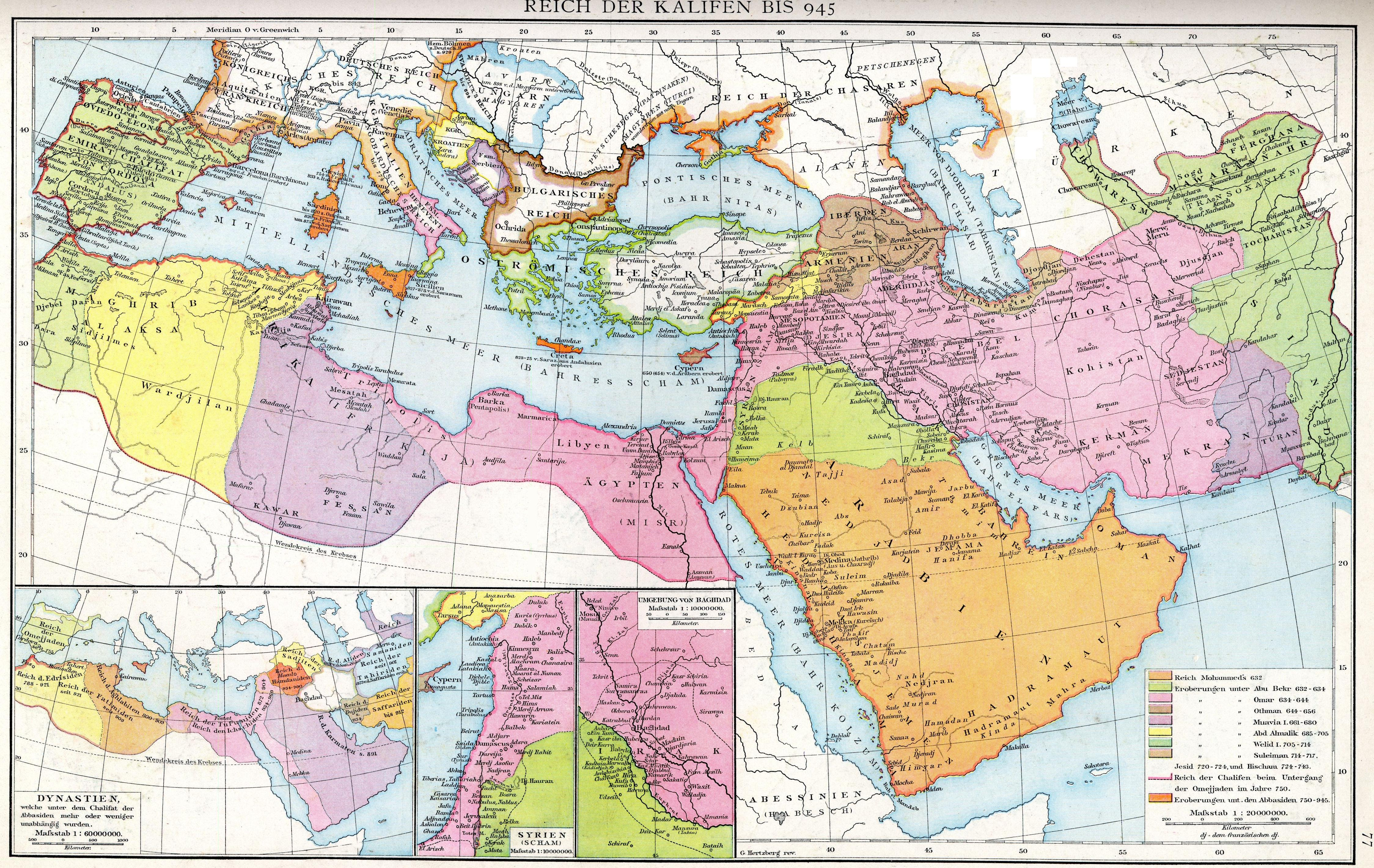
A map depicting growth of the Caliphate. During the reign of Mu'awiya, the Muslims conquered the region of Ifriqiya (central North Africa; shaded in purple)

The Arabs had not advanced beyond Cyrenaica since the 640s, other than periodic raids. During Mu'awiya's reign, the expeditions against Byzantine North Africa were renewed. In 665 or 666 Ibn Hudayj led an army which raided Byzacena (southern district of Byzantine Africa) and Gabes and temporarily captured Bizerte before withdrawing to Egypt. The following year Mu'awiya dispatched Fadala and Ruwayfi ibn Thabit to raid the commercially valuable island of Djerba. Meanwhile, in 662 or 667, Uqba ibn Nafi, a Qurayshite commander who had played a key role in the Arabs' capture of Cyrenaica in 641, reasserted Muslim influence in the Fezzan region, capturing the Zawila oasis and the Garamantes capital of Germa. He may have raided as far south as Kawar in modern-day Niger.

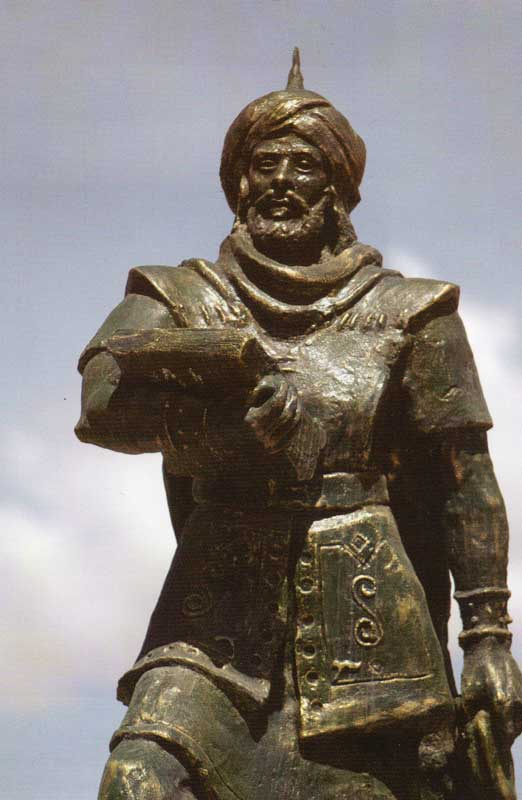
A statue representing Uqba ibn Nafi, who conquered Ifriqiya and founded Kairouan in 670 under Mu'awiya. Uqba served as lieutenant governor of North Africa until his dismissal in 673.

The struggle over the succession of Constantine IV drew Byzantine focus away from the African front. In 670, Mu'awiya appointed Uqba as Egypt's deputy governor over the North African lands under Arab control west of Egypt. At the head of a 10,000-strong force, Uqba commenced his expedition against the territories west of Cyrenaica. As he advanced, his army was joined by Islamized Luwata Berbers and their combined forces conquered Ghadamis, Gafsa and the Jarid. In the last region he established a permanent Arab garrison town called Kairouan, at a relatively safe distance from Carthage and the coastal areas, which had remained under Byzantine control, to serve as a base for further expeditions. The new Arab center also aided Muslim conversion efforts among the Berber tribes that dominated the surrounding countryside.

Mu'awiya dismissed Uqba in 673, probably out of concern that he would form an independent power base in the lucrative regions that he had conquered. The new Arab province, Ifriqiya (modern-day Tunisia), remained subordinate to the governor of Egypt, who sent his mawla (non-Arab, Muslim freedman) Abu al-Muhajir Dinar to replace Uqba, who was arrested and transferred to Mu'awiya's custody in Damascus. Abu al-Muhajir continued the westward campaigns as far as Tlemcen and defeated the Awraba Berber chief Kasila, who subsequently embraced Islam and joined his forces. In 678, a treaty between the Arabs and the Byzantines ceded Byzacena to the Caliphate, while forcing the Arabs to withdraw from the northern parts of the province. After Mu'awiya's death, his successor Yazid reappointed Uqba, Kasila defected and a Byzantine–Berber alliance ended Arab control over Ifriqiya, which was not reestablished until the reign of Caliph Abd al-Malik ibn Marwan (r. 685–705).

=== Nomination of Yazid as successor ===
In a move unprecedented in Islamic politics, Mu'awiya nominated his son Yazid as his successor. The caliph likely held ambitions for his son's succession over a considerable period. In 666, he allegedly had his governor in Homs, Abd al-Rahman ibn Khalid, poisoned to remove him as a potential rival to Yazid. The Syrian Arabs, with whom Abd al-Rahman ibn Khalid was popular, had viewed the governor as the caliph's most suitable successor by dint of his military record and descent from Khalid ibn al-Walid. (Note: The claim that Mu'awiya had Abd al-Rahman ibn Khalid poisoned by his Christian doctor Ibn Uthal is found in the medieval Islamic histories of al-Mada'ini, al-Tabari, al-Baladhuri and Mus'ab ibn al-Zubayr, among others and is accepted by historian Wilferd Madelung, while historians Martin Hinds and Julius Wellhausen consider Mu'awiya's role in the affair as an allegation of the early Muslim sources. The Orientalists Michael Jan de Goeje and Henri Lammens dismiss the claim; the former called it an "absurdity" and "incredible" that Mu'awiya "would have deprived himself of one of his best men" and the more likely scenario was that Abd al-Rahman ibn Khalid had been ill and Mu'awiya attempted to have him treated by Ibn Uthal, who was unsuccessful. De Goeje further doubts the credibility of the reports as they originated in Medina, the home of his Banu Makhzum clan, rather than Homs where Abd al-Rahman ibn Khalid had died.)

It was not until the latter half of his reign that Mu'awiya publicly declared Yazid heir apparent, though the early Muslim sources offer divergent details about the timing and location of the events relating to the decision. The accounts of al-Mada'ini (752–843) and Ibn al-Athir (1160–1232) agree that al-Mughira was the first to suggest that Yazid be acknowledged as Mu'awiya's successor and that Ziyad supported the nomination with the caveat that Yazid abandon impious activities which could arouse opposition from the Muslim polity. According to al-Tabari, Mu'awiya publicly announced his decision in 675 or 676 and demanded oaths of allegiance be given to Yazid. Ibn al-Athir alone relates that delegations from all the provinces were summoned to Damascus where Mu'awiya lectured them on his rights as ruler, their duties as subjects and Yazid's worthy qualities, which was followed by the calls of al-Dahhak ibn Qays and other courtiers that Yazid be recognized as the caliph's successor. The delegates lent their support, with the exception of the senior Basran nobleman al-Ahnaf ibn Qays, who was ultimately bribed into compliance. Al-Mas'udi (896–956) and al-Tabari do not mention provincial delegations other than a Basran embassy led by Ubayd Allah ibn Ziyad in 678–679 or 679–680, respectively, which recognized Yazid.

According to Hinds, in addition to Yazid's nobility and sound judgement, "most important of all" was his Kalbite heritage. The Kalb-led Quda'a confederation was the foundation of Mu'awiya's rule, and Yazid's succession signaled the continuation of this alliance. In nominating Yazid, the son of the Kalbite Maysun, Mu'awiya bypassed his older son Abd Allah from his Qurayshite wife Fakhita. Although support from the Kalb and the Quda'a was guaranteed, Mu'awiya exhorted Yazid to widen his tribal support base in Syria. As the Qaysites were the predominant element in the northern frontier armies, Mu'awiya's appointment of Yazid to lead the war efforts with Byzantium may have served to foster Qaysite support for his nomination. Mu'awiya's efforts to that end were not entirely successful as reflected in a line by a Qaysite poet: "we will never pay allegiance to the son of a Kalbi woman [i.e. Yazid]".

In Medina, Mu'awiya's distant kinsmen Marwan ibn al-Hakam, Sa'id ibn al-As and Abd Allah ibn Amir accepted Mu'awiya's succession order. Most opponents of Mu'awiya's order in Iraq and among the Umayyads and Quraysh of the Hejaz were ultimately threatened or bribed into acceptance. The remaining principal opposition emanated from Husayn ibn Ali, Abd Allah ibn al-Zubayr, Abd Allah ibn Umar and Abd al-Rahman ibn Abi Bakr. As these men were all prominent Medina-based sons of earlier caliphs or close companions of Muhammad, they held the strongest rival claims to the caliphate; consequently, Mu'awiya was determined to obtain their recognition. According to the historian Awana ibn al-Hakam (d. 764), before his death, Mu'awiya ordered certain measures to be taken against them, entrusting these tasks to his loyalists al-Dahhak ibn Qays and Muslim ibn Uqba.

== Death ==
Mu'awiya died from an illness in Damascus in Rajab 60 AH (April or May 680 CE), at around the age of 80. The medieval accounts vary regarding the specific date of his death, with Hisham ibn al-Kalbi (d. 819) placing it on 7 April, al-Waqidi on 21 April and al-Mada'ini on 29 April. Yazid, who was away from Damascus at the time of his father's death, is held by Abu Mikhnaf (d. 774) to have succeeded him on 7 April, while the Nestorian chronicler Elias of Nisibis (d. 1046) says it occurred on 21 April.

In his last testament, Mu'awiya told his family "Fear God, Almighty and Great, for God, praise Him, protects whoever fears Him, and there is no protector for one who does not fear God". He was buried next to the Bab al-Saghir gate of the city and the funeral prayers were led by al-Dahhak ibn Qays, who mourned Mu'awiya as the "stick of the Arabs and the blade of the Arabs, by means of whom God, Almighty and Great, cut off strife, whom He made sovereign over mankind, by means of whom he conquered countries, but now he has died".

Mu'awiya's grave was a visitation site as late as the 10th century. Al-Mas'udi holds that a mausoleum was built over the grave and was open to visitors on Mondays and Thursdays. Ibn Taghribirdi asserts that Ahmad ibn Tulun, the autonomous 9th-century ruler of Egypt and Syria, erected a structure on the grave in 883 or 884 and employed members of the public to regularly recite the Qur'an and light candles around the tomb.

== Assessment and legacy ==
Like Uthman, Mu'awiya adopted the title khalifat Allah ('deputy of God'), instead of khalifat rasul Allah ('deputy of the messenger of God'), the title used by the other caliphs who preceded him. The title may have implied political as well as religious authority and divine sanctioning. He is reported by al-Baladhuri to have said "The earth belongs to God and I am the deputy of God". Nevertheless, whatever the absolutist connotations the title may have had, Mu'awiya did not impose religious authority. Instead, he governed indirectly like a supra-tribal chief using alliances with provincial ashraf, his personal skills, persuasive power, and wit.

Apart from his war with Ali, he did not deploy his Syrian troops domestically, and often used monetary gifts as a tool to avoid conflict. In Julius Wellhausen's assessment, Mu'awiya was an accomplished diplomat "allowing matters to ripen of themselves, and only now and then assisting their progress". He further states that Mu'awiya had the ability to identify and employ the most talented men at his service and made even those whom he distrusted work for him.

In the view of the historian Patricia Crone, Mu'awiya's successful rule was facilitated by the tribal composition of Syria. There, the Arabs who formed his support base were distributed throughout the countryside and were dominated by a single confederation, the Quda'a. This was in contrast to Iraq and Egypt, where the diverse tribal composition of the garrison towns meant that the government had no cohesive support base and had to create a delicate balance between the opposing tribal groups. As evidenced by the disintegration of Ali's Iraqi alliance, maintaining this balance was untenable. In her view, Mu'awiya's taking advantage of the tribal circumstances in Syria prevented the dissolution of the Caliphate in the civil war. In the words of the orientalist Martin Hinds, the success of Mu'awiya's style of governance is "attested by the fact that he managed to hold his kingdom together without ever having to resort to using his Syrian troops".

In the long-term, Mu'awiya's system proved precarious and unviable. Reliance on personal relations meant his government was dependent on paying and pleasing its agents instead of commanding them. This created a "system of indulgence", according to Crone. The governors became increasingly unaccountable and amassed personal wealth. The tribal balance on which he relied was insecure and a slight fluctuation would lead to factionalism and infighting. When Yazid became caliph, he continued his father's model. Controversial as his nomination had been, he had to face the rebellions of Husayn and Ibn al-Zubayr. Although he was able to defeat them with the help of his governors and the Syrian army, the system fractured as soon as he died in November 683. The provincial ashraf defected to Ibn al-Zubayr, as did the Qaysite tribes, who had migrated to Syria during Mu'awiya's reign and were opposed to the Quda'a confederation on whom Sufyanid power rested. Within a matter of months the authority of Yazid's successor, Mu'awiya II, had become restricted to Damascus and its environs. Although the Umayyads, backed by the Quda'a, were able to reconquer the Caliphate after the decade-long second civil war, it was under the leadership of Marwan, founder of the new ruling Umayyad house, the Marwanids, and his son Abd al-Malik. Having realized the weakness of Mu'awiya's model and lacking in his political skill, the Marwanids abandoned his system in favor of a more traditional form of governance where the caliph was the central authority. Nonetheless, the hereditary succession introduced by Mu'awiya became a permanent feature of many of the Muslim governments that followed.

Kennedy views the preservation of the Caliphate's unity as Mu'awiya's greatest achievement. Expressing a similar viewpoint, R. Stephen Humphreys states that although maintaining the integrity of the Caliphate would have been an achievement on its own, Mu'awiya was intent on vigorously continuing the conquests that had been initiated by Abu Bakr and Umar. By creating a formidable navy, he made the Caliphate the dominant force in the eastern Mediterranean and the Aegean Sea. Control of northeastern Iran was secured and the Caliphate's frontier was expanded in North Africa. Madelung deems Mu'awiya a corruptor of the caliphal office, under whom the precedence in Islam (sabiqa), which was the determining factor in the choice of earlier caliphs, gave way to the might of the sword, the people became his subjects and he became the "absolute lord over their life and death", thereby strangling the communal spirit of Islam and using religion as a tool of "social control, exploitation and military terrorization".

Mu'awiya was the first caliph whose name appeared on coins, inscriptions, or documents of the nascent Islamic empire. The inscriptions from his reign lacked any explicit reference to Islam or Muhammad and the only titles that appear are 'servant of God' and 'commander of the faithful'. This has led some modern historians to question Mu'awiya's commitment to Islam. (Note: These include Fred M. Donner, Yehuda D. Nevo, Karl-Heinz Ohlig, and Gerd R. Puin.) They have proposed that he adhered to a non-confessional or indeterminate form of monotheism, or may have been a Christian. Asserting that the earliest Muslims did not see their faith as different from other monotheistic faiths, these historians see the earlier Medina-based caliphs in the same vein, but no public proclamations from their period exist. On the other hand, the historian Robert Hoyland notes that Mu'awiya gave a very Islamic challenge to the Byzantine emperor Constans to "deny [the divinity of] Jesus and turn to the Great God whom I worship, the God of our father Abraham" and speculates that Mu'awiya's tour of Christian sites in Jerusalem was done to demonstrate "the fact that he, and not the Byzantine emperor, was now God's representative on earth".

=== Early historical tradition ===
The surviving Muslim histories originated in Abbasid-era Iraq. The compilers, the narrators from whom the stories were collected, and the overall public sentiment in Iraq were hostile to the Syria-based Umayyads, under whom Syria was a privileged province and Iraq was locally perceived as a Syrian colony. Moreover, the Abbasids, having overthrown the Umayyads in 750, saw them as illegitimate rulers and further tarnished their memory to enhance their own legitimacy. Abbasid caliphs like al-Saffah, al-Ma'mun, and al-Mu'tadid publicly condemned Mu'awiya and other Umayyad caliphs. As such, the Muslim historical tradition is by and large anti-Umayyad. Nonetheless, in the case of Mu'awiya it portrays him in a relatively balanced manner.

On the one hand, it portrays him as a successful ruler who implemented his will with persuasion instead of force. It stresses his quality of hilm, which in his case meant mildness, slowness to anger, subtlety, and management of people by perceiving their needs and desires. The historical tradition is rife with anecdotes of his political acumen and self-control. In one such anecdote, when inquired about allowing one of his courtiers to address him with arrogance, he remarked:

I do not insert myself between the people and their tongue, so long as they do not insert themselves between us and our sovereignty.

The tradition presents him operating in the way of a traditional tribal sheikh who lacks absolute authority; summoning delegations (wufud) of tribal chiefs, and persuading them with flattery, arguments, and presents. This is exemplified in a saying attributed to him: "I never use my voice if I can use my money, never my whip if I can use my voice, never my sword if I can use my whip; but, if I have to use my sword, I will."

On the other hand, the tradition also portrays him as a despot who transformed the caliphate into kingship. In the words of al-Ya'qubi (d. 898):

[Mu'awiya] was the first to have a bodyguard, police-force and chamberlains ... He had somebody walk in front of him with a spear, took alms out of the stipends and sat on a throne with the people below him ... He used forced labour for his building projects ... He was the first to turn this matter [the caliphate] into mere kingship.

Al-Baladhuri calls him the 'Khosrow of the Arabs' (Kisra al-Arab). 'Khosrow' was used by the Arabs as a reference to Sasanian Persian monarchs in general, who the Arabs associated with worldly splendor and authoritarianism, as opposed to the humility of Muhammad. Mu'awiya was compared to these monarchs mainly because he appointed his son Yazid as the next caliph, which was viewed as a violation of the Islamic principle of shura and an introduction of dynastic rule on par with the Byzantines and Sasanians. The civil war that erupted after Mu'awiya's death is asserted to have been the direct consequence of Yazid's nomination. In the Islamic tradition, Mu'awiya and the Umayyads are given the title of malik (king) instead of khalifa (caliph). A sole exception among the Umayyads is Umar ibn Abd al-Aziz (r. 717–720), who is acknowledged as a legitimate caliph due to his piety and justice, while the succeeding Abbasids are also recognized as caliphs.

The contemporary non-Muslim sources generally present a benign image of Mu'awiya. The Greek historian Theophanes calls him a protosymboulos, 'first among equals'. According to Kennedy, the Nestorian Christian chronicler John bar Penkaye writing in the 690s "has nothing but praise for the first Umayyad caliph ... of whose reign he says 'the peace throughout the world was such that we have never heard, either from our fathers or from our grandparents, or seen that there had ever been any like it'".

=== Muslim religious views ===
In contrast to the four earlier caliphs, who are considered as models of piety and having governed with justice, Mu'awiya is not recognized as a rightly-guided caliph (khalifa rashid) by the Sunnis. He is seen as transforming the caliphate into a worldly and despotic kingship. His acquisition of the caliphate through the civil war and his institution of the hereditary succession by appointing his son Yazid as heir apparent are the principal charges made against him. Although Uthman and Ali had been highly controversial during the early period, religious scholars in the 8th and 9th centuries compromised in order to appease and absorb the Uthmanid and pro-Alid factions. Uthman and Ali were thus regarded along with the first two caliphs as divinely guided, whereas Mu'awiya and those who came after him were viewed as oppressive tyrants. Nevertheless, the Sunnis accord him the status of a companion of Muhammad and consider him a scribe of the Quranic revelation (katib al-wahi). On these accounts, he is also respected. Some Sunnis defend his war against Ali holding that although he was in error, he acted according to his best judgment and had no evil intentions.

Mu'awiya's war with Ali, whom the Shia hold as the true successor of Muhammad, has made him a reviled figure in Shia Islam. According to the Shia, based on this alone Mu'awiya qualifies as an unbeliever, if he was a believer to begin with. In addition, he is held responsible for the killing of a number of Muhammad's companions at Siffin, having ordered the cursing of Ali from the pulpit, appointing Yazid as his successor, who went on to kill Husayn at Karbala, executing the pro-Alid Kufan nobleman Hujr ibn Adi, and assassinating Hasan by poisoning. As such, he has been a particular target of Shia traditions. Some traditions hold him to have been born of an illegitimate relationship between Abu Sufyan's wife Hind and Muhammad's uncle Abbas. His conversion to Islam is held to be devoid of any conviction and to have been motivated by convenience after Muhammad conquered Mecca. On this basis he is given the title of taliq (freed slave of Muhammad). A number of hadiths are ascribed to Muhammad condemning Mu'awiya and his father Abu Sufyan in which he is called "an accursed man (la'in) son of an accursed man" and prophesying that he will die as an unbeliever. Unlike the Sunnis, the Shia deny him the status of a companion and also refute the Sunni claims that he was a scribe of the Quranic revelation. Like other opponents of Ali, Mu'awiya is cursed in a ritual called tabarra, which is held by many Shia to be an obligation.

Amid rising sectarianism among Muslims in the 10th century, while the Abbasid Caliphate was dominated by the Shia Buyid emirs, the figure of Mu'awiya became a propaganda tool used by the Shia and the Sunnis opposed to them. Strong pro-Mu'awiya sentiments were voiced by Sunnis in several Abbasid cities, including Baghdad, Wasit, Raqqa and Isfahan. At about the same time, the Shia were permitted by the Buyids and the Sunni Abbasid caliphs to perform the ritual cursing of Mu'awiya in mosques. In 10th–11th-century Egypt, the figure of Mu'awiya occasionally played a similar role, with the Isma'ili Shia Fatimid caliphs introducing measures opposed to Mu'awiya's memory and opponents of the government using him as a tool to berate the Shia.

Ibadi Islam, which is rooted in Kharijism, adheres to the Kharijite view of Mu'awiya as an apostate. This designation stems not only from his opposition to Ali but also from his efforts to avenge the death of Uthman, whom the Ibadis also classify as an apostate. Early Ibadi doctrine reinforces this stance, maintaining that Mu'awiya's party had deviated from the faith to such an extent that they were to be fought until they were killed or returned to the path of the Quran.

Family tree of Mu'awiya I

Umayya
Abu al-As	Harb
Affan	Al-Hakam	Hind (Note: Hind bint Utba, the granddaughter of Umayya's brother Rabi'a, was the mother of Mu'awiya, Hanzala and Utba.)	Abu Sufyan	Prophet Muhammad
Uthman (r. 644–656)	Marwan I (r. 684–685)	Hanzala	Yazid	Mu'awiya I (r. 661–680)	Anbasa	Utba	Muhammad	Ramla (Umm Habiba)
Abd al-Malik (r. 685–705)	Abd Allah	Yazid I (r. 680–683)	Al-Walid	Uthman
Atika	Mu'awiya II (r. 683–684)	Khalid	Abd Allah (al-Uswar)
Yazid II (r. 720–724)	Abd Allah	Ziyad (Abu Muhammad)	Hashim
Al-Walid II (r. 743–744)	Ali (Abu al-Umaytir)	Yazid

Dashed line indicates marriage

== See also ==
- Muawiya (TV series)

== Bibliography ==
- Athamina, Khalil (1994). "The Appointment and Dismissal of Khalid ibn al-Walid from the Supreme Command: A Study of the Political Strategy of the Early Muslim Caliphs in Syria". Arabica. 41 (2). Brill: 253–272. doi:10.1163/157005894X00191. JSTOR 4057449.
- Bosworth, C. Edmund (1991). "Marwān I b. al-Ḥakam". In Bosworth, C. E.; van Donzel, E. & Pellat, Ch. (eds.). The Encyclopaedia of Islam, Second Edition. Volume VI: Mahk–Mid. Leiden: E. J. Brill. pp. 621–623. ISBN 978-90-04-08112-3.
- Bosworth, C. Edmund (1996). "Arab Attacks on Rhodes in the Pre-Ottoman Period". Journal of the Royal Asiatic Society. 6 (2): 157–164. doi:10.1017/S1356186300007161. JSTOR 25183178. S2CID 163550092.
- Christides, Vassilios (2000). "ʿUkba b. Nāfiʿ". In Bearman, P. J.; Bianquis, Th.; Bosworth, C. E.; van Donzel, E. & Heinrichs, W. P. (eds.). The Encyclopaedia of Islam, Second Edition. Volume X: T–U. Leiden: E. J. Brill. pp. 789–790. ISBN 978-90-04-11211-7.
- Caskel, Werner (1966a). Ğamharat an-nasab: Das genealogische Werk des His̆ām ibn Muḥammad al-Kalbī, Band I [Jamharat al-nasab: The Geneaological Work of Hishām ibn Muḥammad al-Kalbī, Volume I] (in German). Leiden: Brill. OCLC 490272940.
- Caskel, Werner (1966b). Ğamharat an-nasab: Das genealogische Werk des His̆ām ibn Muḥammad al-Kalbī, Band II [Jamharat al-nasab: The Geneaological Work of Hishām ibn Muḥammad al-Kalbī, Volume II] (in German). Leiden: Brill. OCLC 490272940.
- Crone, Patricia; Hinds, Martin (2003) [1986]. God's Caliph: Religious Authority in the First Centuries of Islam. Cambridge: Cambridge University Press. ISBN 0-521-32185-9.
- Crone, Patricia (1994). "Were the Qays and Yemen of the Umayyad Period Political Parties?". Der Islam. 71 (1). Berlin: Walter de Gruyter & Co.: 1–57. doi:10.1515/islm.1994.71.1.1. ISSN 0021-1818. S2CID 154370527.
- Crone, Patricia (2003) [1980]. Slaves on Horses: The Evolution of the Islamic Polity (2003 ed.). Cambridge: Cambridge University Press. ISBN 978-0521529402.
- Dixon, 'Abd al-Ameer A. (1971). The Umayyad Caliphate, 65–86/684–705: (a Political Study). London: Luzac. ISBN 978-0-7189-0149-3.
- Dixon, 'Abd al-Ameer A. (1978). "Kalb b. Wabara – Islamic Period". In van Donzel, E.; Lewis, B.; Pellat, Ch. & Bosworth, C. E. (eds.). The Encyclopaedia of Islam, Second Edition. Volume IV: Iran–Kha. Leiden: E. J. Brill. pp. 493–494. ISBN 978-90-04-05745-6. OCLC 758278456.
- Donner, Fred M. (2012) [2010]. Muhammad and the Believers, at the Origins of Islam. Cambridge, Massachusetts: Harvard University Press. ISBN 978-0-674-05097-6.
- Donner, Fred M. (2014) [1981]. The Early Islamic Conquests. Princeton: Princeton University Press. ISBN 978-0-691-05327-1.
- Elad, Amikam (1999). Medieval Jerusalem and Islamic Worship: Holy Places, Ceremonies, Pilgrimage (2nd ed.). Leiden: Brill. ISBN 90-04-10010-5.
- Ende, Werner [in German] (1977) [1974]. Arabische Nation und islamische Geschichte: Die Umayyaden im Urteil arabischer Autoren des 20. Jahrhunderts [The Arab Nation and Islamic History: The Umayyads in the Judgement of Arab Authors in the 20th Century] (in German). Beirut: Orient-Institut der Deutschen Morgenländischen Gesellschaft. doi:10.25673/112254.
- Foss, Clive (2016) [2010]. "Muʿāwiya's State". In Haldon, John (ed.). Money, Power and Politics in Early Islamic Syria: A Review of Current Debates. London and New York: Routledge. ISBN 978-0-7546-6849-7.
- Foss, Clive (2009). "Egypt under Muʿāwiya Part II: Middle Egypt, Fusṭāṭ and Alexandria". Bulletin of the School of Oriental and African Studies. 72 (2): 259–278. doi:10.1017/S0041977X09000512. JSTOR 40379004.
- Fowden, Garth (2004). Quṣayr ʻAmra: Art and the Umayyad Elite in Late Antique Syria. Berkeley and Los Angeles: University of California Press. ISBN 0-520-23665-3.
- Gardet, Louis (1965). "Fitna". In Lewis, B.; Pellat, Ch. & Schacht, J. (eds.). The Encyclopaedia of Islam, Second Edition. Volume II: C–G. Leiden: E. J. Brill. pp. 930–931. OCLC 495469475.
- Gibb, H. A. R. (1960). "ʿAbd al-Raḥmān b. Khālid b. al-Walīd". In Gibb, H. A. R.; Kramers, J. H.; Lévi-Provençal, E.; Schacht, J.; Lewis, B. & Pellat, Ch. (eds.). The Encyclopaedia of Islam, Second Edition. Volume I: A–B. Leiden: E. J. Brill. p. 85. OCLC 495469456.
- de Goeje, Michael Jan (1911). "Caliphate" . In Chisholm, Hugh (ed.). Encyclopædia Britannica. Vol. 5 (11th ed.). Cambridge University Press. pp. 23–54.
- Grabar, Oleg (1966). "The Earliest Islamic Commemorative Structures, Notes and Documents". Ars Orientalis. 6: 7–46. JSTOR 4629220.
- Halm, Heinz (2003). Die Kalifen von Kairo: Die Fatimiden in Ägypten, 973–1074 [The Caliphs of Cairo: The Fatimids in Egypt, 973–1074] (in German). Munich: C. H. Beck. ISBN 3-406-48654-1.
- Hasson, Isaac (1982). "Remarques sur l'inscription de l'époque de Mu'āwiya à Ḥammat Gader" [Notes on the inscription from the time of Mu'āwiya to Ḥammat Gader]. Israel Exploration Journal (in French). 32 (2/3): 97–102. JSTOR 27925830.
- Hasson, Isaac (2002). "Ziyād b. Abīhi". In Bearman, P. J.; Bianquis, Th.; Bosworth, C. E.; van Donzel, E. & Heinrichs, W. P. (eds.). The Encyclopaedia of Islam, Second Edition. Volume XI: W–Z. Leiden: E. J. Brill. pp. 519–522. ISBN 978-90-04-12756-2.
- Hawting, G. R., ed. (1996). The History of al-Ṭabarī, Volume XVII: The First Civil War: From the Battle of Siffīn to the Death of ʿAlī, A.D. 656–661/A.H. 36–40. SUNY Series in Near Eastern Studies. Albany, New York: State University of New York Press. ISBN 978-0-7914-2393-6.
- Hawting, Gerald R. (2000). The First Dynasty of Islam: The Umayyad Caliphate AD 661–750 (Second ed.). London and New York: Routledge. ISBN 0-415-24072-7.
- Hawting, Gerald R. (2002). "Yazīd (I) b. Mu'āwiya". In Bearman, P. J.; Bianquis, Th.; Bosworth, C. E.; van Donzel, E. & Heinrichs, W. P. (eds.). The Encyclopaedia of Islam, Second Edition. Volume XI: W–Z. Leiden: E. J. Brill. pp. 309–311. ISBN 978-90-04-12756-2.
- Hinds, Martin (1972). "The Siffin Arbitration Agreement". Journal of Semitic Studies. 17 (1): 93–129. doi:10.1093/jss/17.1.93.
- Hinds, Martin (1991). "Makhzūm". In Bosworth, C. E.; van Donzel, E. & Pellat, Ch. (eds.). The Encyclopaedia of Islam, Second Edition. Volume VI: Mahk–Mid. Leiden: E. J. Brill. pp. 137–140. ISBN 978-90-04-08112-3.
- Hinds, Martin (1993). "Muʿāwiya I b. Abī Sufyān". In Bosworth, C. E.; van Donzel, E.; Heinrichs, W. P. & Pellat, Ch. (eds.). The Encyclopaedia of Islam, Second Edition. Volume VII: Mif–Naz. Leiden: E. J. Brill. pp. 263–268. ISBN 978-90-04-09419-2.
- Hirschfeld, Yizhar (1987). "The History and Town-Plan of Ancient Ḥammat Gādẹ̄r". Zeitschrift des Deutschen Palästina-Vereins. 103: 101–116. JSTOR 27931308.
- Hoffman, Valerie J. (2012). The Essentials of Ibadi Islam. Syracuse University Press. ISBN 978-0-8156-5084-3.
- Howard-Johnston, James (2010). Witnesses to a World Crisis: Historians and Histories of the Middle East in the Seventh Century. Oxford: Oxford University Press. ISBN 978-0-19-920859-3.
- Hoyland, Robert G. (1999). "Jacob of Edessa on Islam". In Reinink, G. J.; Klugkist, A. C. (eds.). After Bardaisan: Studies on Continuity and Change in Syriac Christianity in Honour of Professor Han J. W. Drijvers. Leuven: Peeters Publishers. ISBN 90-429-0735-5.
- Hoyland, Robert G. (2015). In God's Path: the Arab Conquests and the Creation of an Islamic Empire. Oxford: Oxford University Press. ISBN 978-0-19-991636-8.
- Humphreys, R. Stephen (2006). Mu'awiya ibn Abi Sufyan: From Arabia to Empire. Oneworld Publications. ISBN 1-85168-402-6.
- Hyder, Syed Akbar (2006). Reliving Karbala: Martyrdom in South Asian Memory. Oxford: Oxford University Press. ISBN 978-0-19-537302-8.
- Jandora, John W. (1986). "Developments in Islamic Warfare: The Early Conquests". Studia Islamica (64): 101–113. doi:10.2307/1596048. JSTOR 1596048.
- Jankowiak, Marek (2013). "The First Arab Siege of Constantinople". In Zuckerman, Constantin (ed.). Travaux et mémoires, Vol. 17: Constructing the Seventh Century. Paris: Association des Amis du Centre d’Histoire et Civilisation de Byzance. pp. 237–320.
- Kaegi, Walter E. (1995) [1992]. Byzantium and the Early Islamic Conquests. Cambridge: Cambridge University Press. ISBN 0-521-41172-6.
- Kaegi, Walter E. (2010). Muslim Expansion and Byzantine Collapse in North Africa. Cambridge: Cambridge University Press. ISBN 978-0-521-19677-2.
- Kennedy, Hugh (1998). "Egypt as a Province in the Islamic Caliphate, 641–868". In Petry, Carl F. (ed.). Cambridge History of Egypt, Volume One: Islamic Egypt, 640–1517. Cambridge: Cambridge University Press. pp. 62–85. ISBN 0-521-47137-0.
- Kennedy, Hugh (2001). The Armies of the Caliphs: Military and Society in the Early Islamic State. London and New York: Routledge. ISBN 0-415-25093-5.
- Kennedy, Hugh (2004) [1986]. The Prophet and the Age of the Caliphates: The Islamic Near East from the 6th to the 11th Century (Second ed.). Harlow: Longman. ISBN 978-0-582-40525-7.
- Kennedy, Hugh (2007). The Great Arab Conquests: How the Spread of Islam Changed the World We Live In. Philadelphia, Pennsylvania: Da Capo Press. ISBN 978-0-306-81740-3.
- Kennedy, Hugh (2016). Caliphate: The History of an Idea. New York: Basic Books. ISBN 978-0-465-09439-4.
- Kohlberg, Etan [in German] (2020). In Praise of the Few. Studies in Shiʿi Thought and History. Leiden: Brill. ISBN 978-90-04-40697-1.
- Kraemer, Joel L. (1992) [1986]. Humanism in the Renaissance of Islam: The Cultural Revival During the Buyid Age (Second Revised ed.). Leiden, New York and Koln: Brill. ISBN 90-04-09736-8.
- Lammens, Henri (1960). "Baḥdal". In Gibb, H. A. R.; Kramers, J. H.; Lévi-Provençal, E.; Schacht, J.; Lewis, B. & Pellat, Ch. (eds.). The Encyclopaedia of Islam, Second Edition. Volume I: A–B. Leiden: E. J. Brill. pp. 919–920. OCLC 495469456.
- Lewis, Bernard (2002). Arabs in History. Oxford: Oxford University Press. ISBN 978-0-19-164716-1.
- Lilie, Ralph-Johannes (1976). Die byzantinische Reaktion auf die Ausbreitung der Araber. Studien zur Strukturwandlung des byzantinischen Staates im 7. und 8. Jhd [The Byzantine Response to the Spread of the Arabs. Studies on the structural change of the Byzantine state in the 7th and 8th centuries] (in German). Munich: Institut für Byzantinistik und Neugriechische Philologie der Universität München. OCLC 797598069.
- Lynch, Ryan J. (2016). "Cyprus and Its Legal and Historiographical Significance in Early Islamic History". Journal of the American Oriental Society. 136 (3): 535–550. doi:10.7817/jameroriesoci.136.3.0535. JSTOR 10.7817/jameroriesoci.136.3.0535.
- Madelung, Wilferd (1997). The Succession to Muhammad: A Study of the Early Caliphate. Cambridge: Cambridge University Press. ISBN 0-521-56181-7.
- Marsham, Andrew (2013). "The Architecture of Allegiance in Early Islamic Late Antiquity: The Accession of Mu'awiya in Jerusalem, ca. 661 CE". In Beihammer, Alexander; Constantinou, Stavroula; Parani, Maria (eds.). Court Ceremonies and Rituals of Power in Byzantium and the Medieval Mediterranean. Leiden and Boston: Brill. pp. 87–114. ISBN 978-90-04-25686-6.
- Miles, George C. [in French] (1948). "Early Islamic Inscriptions Near Ṭāʾif in the Ḥijāz". Journal of Near Eastern Studies. 7 (4): 236–242. doi:10.1086/370887. JSTOR 542216. S2CID 162403885.
- Morony, M. (1986). "Kisrā". In Bosworth, C. E.; van Donzel, E.; Lewis, B. & Pellat, Ch. (eds.). The Encyclopaedia of Islam, Second Edition. Volume V: Khe–Mahi. Leiden: E. J. Brill. pp. 184–185. ISBN 978-90-04-07819-2.
- Pierce, Matthew (2016). Twelve Infallible Men: The Imams and the Making of Shiʿism. Cambridge, Massachusetts: Harvard University Press. ISBN 978-0-674-73707-5.
- Al-Rashid, Saad bin Abdulaziz (2008). "Sadd al-Khanaq: An Early Umayyad Dam near Medina, Saudi Arabia". Proceedings of the Seminar for Arabian Studies. 38. Archaeopress: 265–275. JSTOR 41223953.
- Morony, Michael G., ed. (1987). The History of al-Ṭabarī, Volume XVIII: Between Civil Wars: The Caliphate of Muʿāwiyah, 661–680 A.D./A.H. 40–60. SUNY Series in Near Eastern Studies. Albany, New York: State University of New York Press. ISBN 978-0-87395-933-9.
- Shaban, M. A. (1976) [1971]. Islamic History, A New Interpretation: Volume 1, AD 600–750 (A.H. 132). Cambridge: Cambridge University Press. ISBN 978-0-521-29131-6.
- Shahid, Irfan (2000). "Tanūkh". In Bearman, P. J.; Bianquis, Th.; Bosworth, C. E.; van Donzel, E. & Heinrichs, W. P. (eds.). The Encyclopaedia of Islam, Second Edition. Volume X: T–U. Leiden: E. J. Brill. pp. 190–192. ISBN 978-90-04-11211-7.
- Shahid, Irfan (2000). "Ṭayyīʾ". In Bearman, P. J.; Bianquis, Th.; Bosworth, C. E.; van Donzel, E. & Heinrichs, W. P. (eds.). The Encyclopaedia of Islam, Second Edition. Volume X: T–U. Leiden: E. J. Brill. pp. 402–403. ISBN 978-90-04-11211-7.
- Sharon, Moshe (2018). "Witnessed by Three Disciples of the Prophet: The Jerusalem 32 Inscription from 32 AH/652 CE". Israel Exploration Journal. 68 (1): 100–111. JSTOR 26740639.
- Sourdel, D. (1965). "Filasṭīn – I. Palestine under Islamic Rule". In Lewis, B.; Pellat, Ch. & Schacht, J. (eds.). The Encyclopaedia of Islam, Second Edition. Volume II: C–G. Leiden: E. J. Brill. pp. 910–913. OCLC 495469475.
- Sprengling, Martin (1939). "From Persian to Arabic". The American Journal of Semitic Languages and Literatures. 56 (2). The University of Chicago Press: 175–224. doi:10.1086/370538. JSTOR 528934. S2CID 170486943.
- Stratos, Andreas N. (1978). Byzantium in the Seventh Century, Volume IV: 668–685. Amsterdam: Adolf M. Hakkert. ISBN 978-90-256-0665-7.
- Vaglieri, L. Veccia (1960). "ʿAlī b. Abī Ṭālib". In Gibb, H. A. R.; Kramers, J. H.; Lévi-Provençal, E.; Schacht, J.; Lewis, B. & Pellat, Ch. (eds.). The Encyclopaedia of Islam, Second Edition. Volume I: A–B. Leiden: E. J. Brill. pp. 381–386. OCLC 495469456.
- Watt, W. Montgomery (1960). "Abū Sufyān". In Gibb, H. A. R.; Kramers, J. H.; Lévi-Provençal, E.; Schacht, J.; Lewis, B. & Pellat, Ch. (eds.). The Encyclopaedia of Islam, Second Edition. Volume I: A–B. Leiden: E. J. Brill. p. 151. OCLC 495469456.
- Watt, W. Montgomery (1960). "Badr". In Gibb, H. A. R.; Kramers, J. H.; Lévi-Provençal, E.; Schacht, J.; Lewis, B. & Pellat, Ch. (eds.). The Encyclopaedia of Islam, Second Edition. Volume I: A–B. Leiden: E. J. Brill. pp. 866–867. OCLC 495469456.
- Ibn Dhakwan, Salim (2001). The Epistle of Salim Ibn Dhakwan. Oxford Oriental Monographs. Translated by Crone Patricia; Friedrich Zimmermann. OUP Oxford. ISBN 978-0191590153.
- Wellhausen, Julius (1927). The Arab Kingdom and Its Fall. Translated by Margaret Graham Weir. Calcutta: University of Calcutta.

Mu'awiya I Umayyad dynasty Born: c. 597–605 Died: April 680
Preceded by Hasan ibn Ali	Caliph of Islam; Umayyad Caliph; 661–680	Succeeded by Yazid I
Political offices
Preceded by Yazid ibn Abi Sufyan	Governor of Syria; 639–661	Succeeded by Vacant
