= Maysun bint Bahdal =

Mother of Umayyad caliph Yazid I

Consort of the Umayyad caliph
- Tenure: 661 – 680
- Died: January/March 680; Damascus, Syria, Umayyad Caliphate
- Spouse: Mu'awiya I
- Children: Yazid I
Names
- Maysun bint Bahdal ibn Unayf
- Dynasty: Kalb tribe (by birth); Umayyad (by marriage)
- Father: Bahdal ibn Unayf

Maysun bint Bahdal (Arabic: ميسون بنت بحدل, romanized: Maysūn bint Baḥdal) was a wife of caliph Mu'awiya I (r. 661–680), and as mother of his successor and son Yazid I (r. 680–683). She belonged to a ruling clan of the Banu Kalb, a tribe which dominated the Syrian steppe. Mu'awiya's marriage to her sealed his alliance with the tribe.

Maysun also enjoys a reputation as one of the earliest attested Arabic-language women poets. However, that reputation seems to belong to another woman of a similar name, Maysūn bint Jandal.

== Life ==
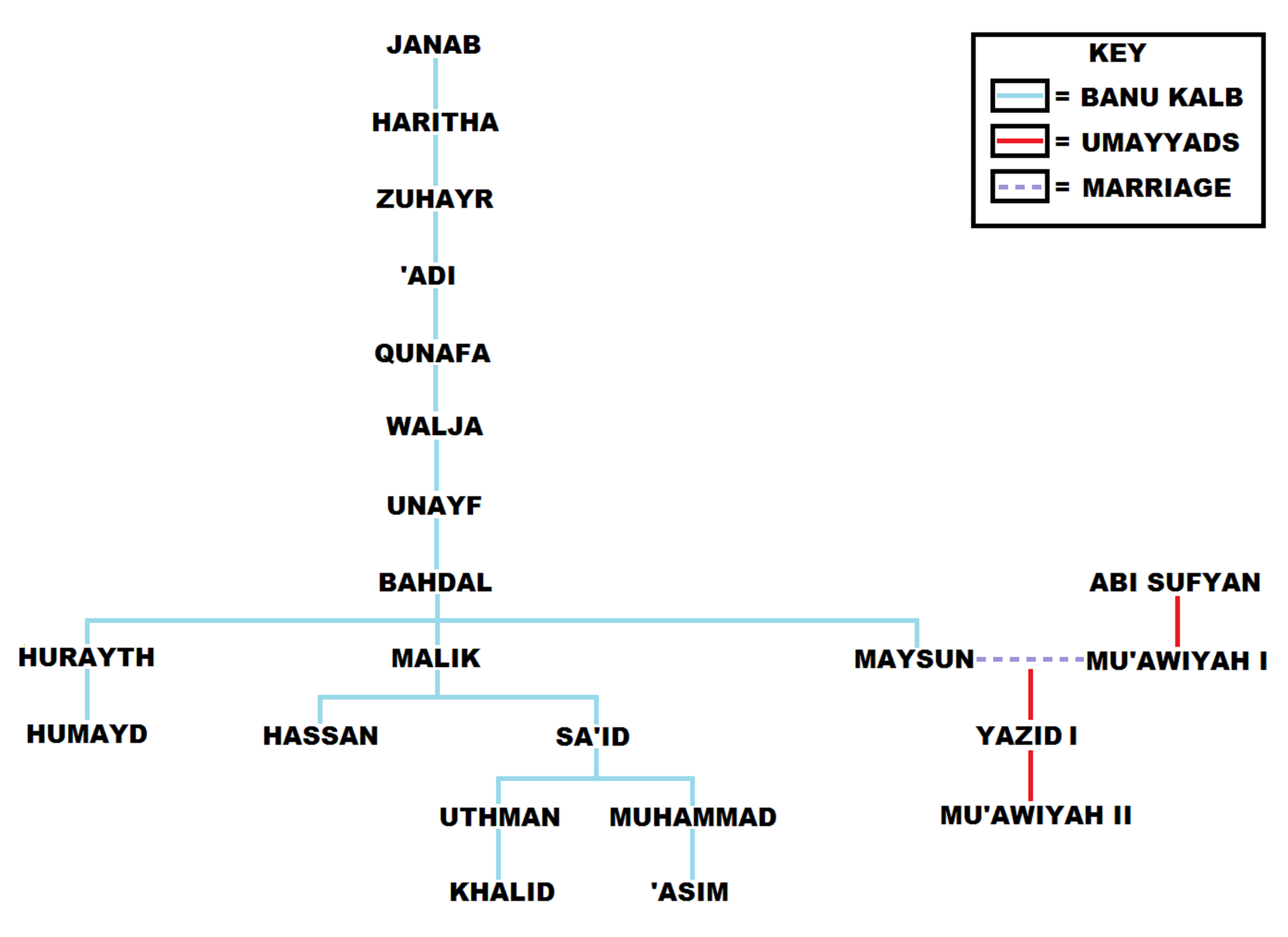
Family tree of Maysun

Maysun belonged to the Bedouin tribe of Kalb. She was the daughter of the Kalbite chieftain Bahdal ibn Unayf. The Kalb dominated the Syrian steppe and led the wider Quda'a tribal confederation. Old confederates of the Byzantine Empire, they took a neutral position during the Muslim conquest of Byzantine Syria. The tribe established links with the Umayyad family, first through Caliph Uthman (r. 644–656), who married a woman of the Kalb. Mu'awiya ibn Abi Sufyan, who governed Syria under Uthman, furthered these ties. By marrying Maysun, perhaps in 645, he sealed his alliance with the tribe. He also married Maysun's paternal cousin Na'ila bint Umara, but divorced her soon after.

The Kalb and the family of Bahdal had been Christians at the time of the conquests and it is not known if Maysun remained Christian following her marriage to Mu'awiya. The historian Moshe Sharon holds that it was "doubtful she converted to Islam".

Maysun was the mother of Mu'awiya's son and nominated successor, Yazid I. She took a considerable interest in educating her son and took him to the desert encampments of the Kalb where Yazid spent part of his youth. She most likely died before Yazid's accession in 680. In the assessment of the historian Nabia Abbott,

Maisūn somewhat eludes us as a vivid personality. She seems to have been wrapped up in the life of her young son whom she delighted to dress up in fine clothing to gladden the eyes of his affectionate father. She is generally credited with taking an interest in the education of Yazid, whom she took with her to the deserts of the Kalb south of Palmyra. She at one time accompanied Mu'awiyah on an expedition into Asia Minor. All in all, she received Mu‘āwiyah's stamp of approval as maid, wife, and mother.

== The poetry of Maysūn bint Jandal ==
Maysūn bint Baḥdal, wife of Mu‘āwiya I, is named in some secondary sources as Maysūn bint Jandal. Maysūn bint Jandal seems, however, to have been a different woman, of the Fazārah. This Maisūn is apparently the author of the following celebrated poem, which has often been misattributed to Maysūn bint Baḥdal, enabling the characterisation of Mu‘āwiya I's wife as colourfully committed to country life; the story even circulates that Mu‘āwiya divorced Maysūn bint Baḥdal because of the offence he took at this poem and that she took her young son with her to grow up in the desert. As paraphrased by H. W. Freeland, the poem runs as follows:

I give thee all the treacherous brightness

Of glittering robes which grace the fair,

Then give me back my young heart's lightness

And simple vest of Camel's hair.

The tent on which free winds are beating

Is dearer to the Desert's child

Than Palaces and kingly greeting?

O bear me to my desert wild!

More dear than swift mule softly treading,

While gentlest hands his speed control,

Are camels rough their lone way threading

Where caravans through deserts roll.

On couch of silken ease reclining

I watch the kitten's sportive play,

But feel the while my young heart pining

For desert guests and watch-dog's bay.

The frugal desert's banquet slender,

The simple crust which tents afford,

Are dearer than the courtly splendour

And sweets which grace a monarch's board.

And dearer far the voices pealing

From winds which sweep the desert round

Than Pomp and Power their pride revealing

In noisy timbrel's measur'd sound.

Then bear me far from kingly dwelling,

From Luxury's cold and pamper'd child,

To seek a heart with freedom swelling,

A kindred heart in deserts wild.

This poem is part of a wider trend of women's verse expressing nostalgia for the desert in the context of an increasingly urbanising society.

=== Editions and translations ===
- Freeland, H. W. (1886). "Gleanings from the Arabic. The Lament of Maisun, the Bedouin Wife of Muâwiya". Journal of the Royal Asiatic Society of Great Britain and Ireland. 18 (1): 89–91. doi:10.1017/S0035869X00019201. JSTOR 25208818.
- Theodor Nöldeke, Delectus veterum carminum arabicorum (Berlin: Reuther, 1890), p. 25, https://archive.org/details/delectusveterum00mlgoog (edition)
- Redhouse, J. W. (1886). "Observations on the Various Texts and Translations of the so-called 'Song of Meysūn'; An Inquiry into Meysūn's Claim to Its Authorship; and an Appendix on Arabic Transliteration and Pronunciation". The Journal of the Royal Asiatic Society of Great Britain and Ireland. 18 (2): 268–322. doi:10.1017/S0035869X00165682. JSTOR 25208828.
- Classical Poems by Arab Women: A Bilingual Anthology, ed. and trans. by Abdullah al-Udhari (London: Saqi Books, 1999), 78-79 (edition and translation)

== Bibliography ==
- Lammens, H. (1993) [1927]. "Maisūn". In Houtsma, Th.; Wensinck, A. J.; Lévi-Provençal, E.; Gibb, H. A. R.; Heffening, W. (eds.). E.J. Brill's First Encyclopaedia of Islam, 1913-1936, Volume 5, L–Moriscos (Reprint ed.). Leiden, New York and Koln: Brill. p. 156. ISBN 90-04-09791-0.
- Marsham, Andrew (2009). Rituals of Islamic Monarchy: Accession and Succession in the First Muslim Empire. Edinburgh: Edinburgh University Press. ISBN 978-0-7486-3077-6.
- Sharon, Moshe (2013). Corpus Inscriptionum Arabicarum Palaestinae, Volume Five: H-I. Leiden and Boston: Brill. ISBN 978-90-04-25097-0.
