= Qasr Bshir =

Ruined Roman fort in Jordan

- Part of Limes Arabicus
- Jordan
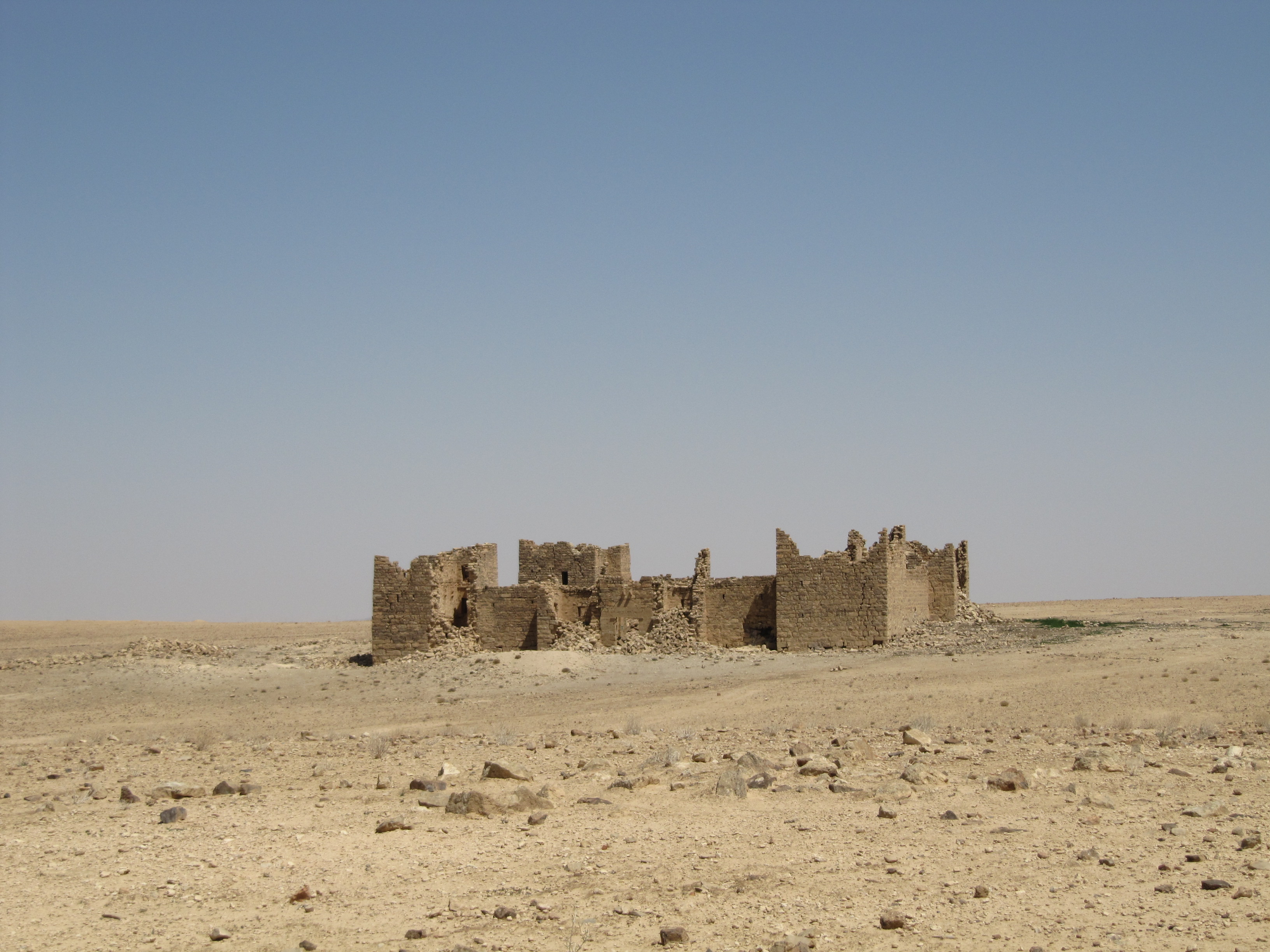
- Exterior

Location
- Location within Jordan
- Coordinates: 31°20′14″N 35°58′52″E
- Height: 10 metres

Site history
- Built: 293–305 AD
- Built by: Roman Empire
- Fate: Abandoned

Qasr Bshir (Arabic: قصر بشير; Latin: Castra Praetorii Mobeni) is an ancient Roman fortification in what is now Jordan. Isolated in an area of the desert rippled with shallow valleys that drain into the Wadi Mujib, it is about 80 kilometres (50 mi) south of the capital city, Amman. The structure is not visible from any settlement or Jordan's Desert Highway. It measures about 57 metres (187 ft) square and stands three storeys tall at the towers. Qasr Bshir is one of the best-preserved examples of a castellum (a small Roman fort), and the best surviving example of the four-towered forts that Rome built during the 3rd and 4th centuries; its original Latin inscription survives above the entrance.

The fort was part of the Limes Arabicus, a chain of forts and watchtowers on the eastern desert frontier of the Roman Empire. The Limes Arabicus offered protection for the Roman frontiers from raids by Arab nomads, while also promoting trade and allowing Rome to control access to water. The fortifications were just close enough to maintain communication. Although it is now located where the Syrian Desert meets the semi-arid steppe country in the Jordanian Highlands, the area once experienced higher rainfall, and there is evidence of agriculture during classical antiquity. By 500 AD, the eastern forts, including Qasr Bshir, were abandoned. Centuries later, the Umayyads reoccupied the site until a 747 earthquake caused its barracks to collapse.

Archaeologists have studied the site since the late 19th century. In the 1980s, the Central Limes Arabicus Project conducted excavations along the Limes. They tested Roman long-distance communication between outposts like Qasr Bshir and Qasr Abu el-Kharaq using smoke, mirrors, and torches. The fort is on Jordan's Tentative List as a potential UNESCO World Heritage Site, and a conservation project launched in 2022 is working to stabilise the structure.

== Location ==
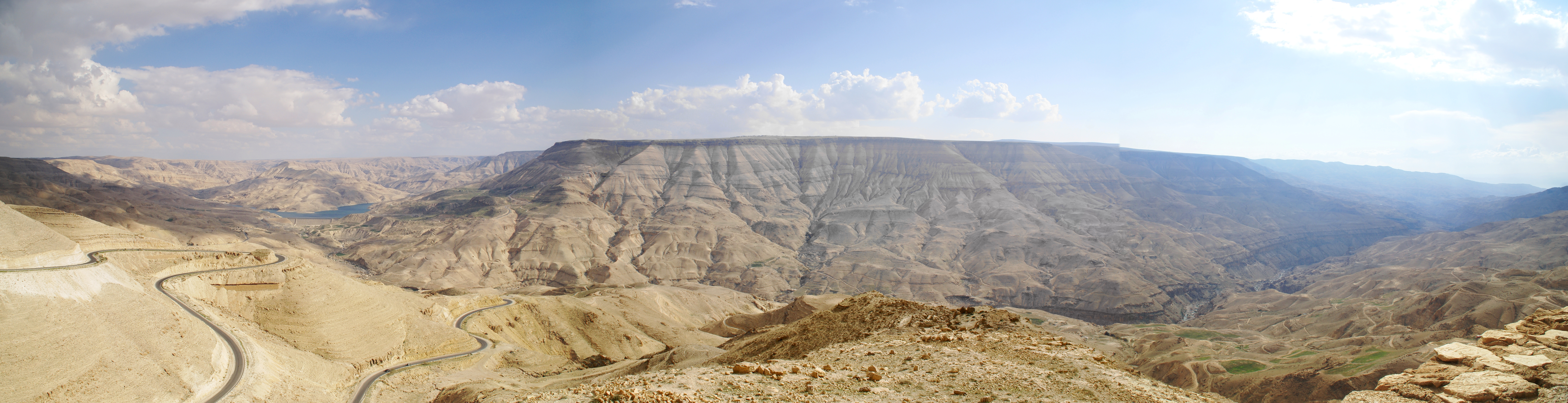
Wadi Mujib cutting through the Moab Plateau

Qasr Bshir is situated just below the crest of a gentle slope on a stony stretch of the Moab Plateau (Karak Governorate), positioned roughly at 800 metres above sea level. It overlooks the surrounding steppe to the north, east, and west. To the west, shallow valleys drain into the Wadi Mujib river. Its tributary, the Wadi Su'aydah, runs beyond a ridge of hills about 3 kilometres (1.9 mi) to the north of Qasr Bshir. Beyond the Wadi Mujib, the fertile and inhabited regions of the Moab Plateau are visible. The steppe gives way to the Syrian Desert east of the fort.

Located far from any settlement and approximately 80 kilometres (50 mi) south of the Jordanian capital city, Amman, the fort cannot be seen from Desert Highway.

Qasr Bshir was founded over 1700 years ago on the eastern fringe of the Roman Empire as part of the Limes Arabicus. It was built 15 kilometres (9.3 mi) northeast of the large legionary camp at Betthorus, now known as Lejjun.

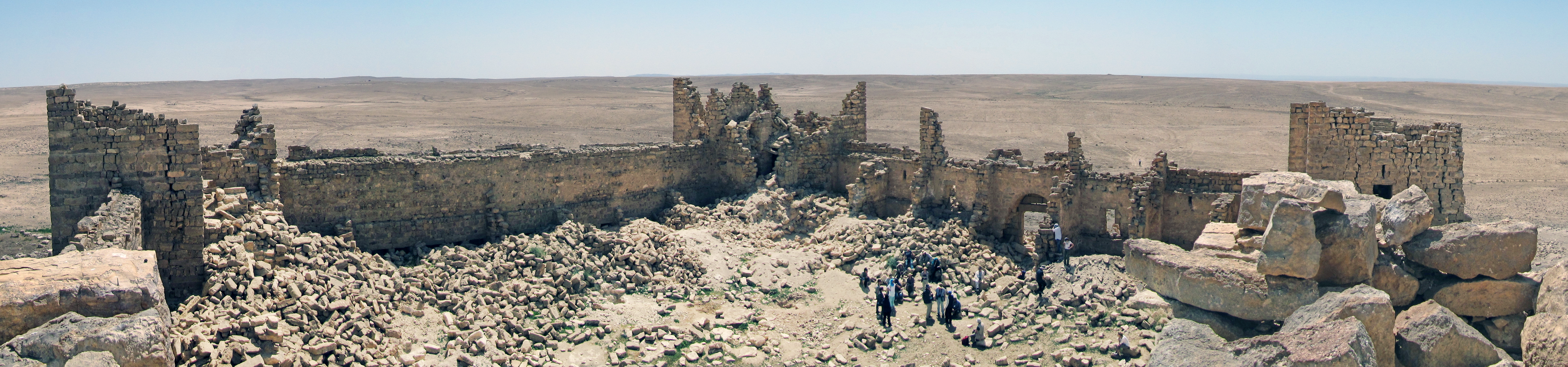
Interior strewn with rubble, photographed from one of the towers

== Etymology ==
Roman inscriptions used the terms castrum (plural castra) and 'castellum' interchangeably to describe smaller forts in Jordan. The inscription above the fort's main entrance identifies it as Castra Praetorii Mobeni. Mobeni (or Mobene, as the fort is still sometimes called) refers to the Moab Plateau.

A praetorium was a residence for a governor on tour. Benjamin Isaac argued that the building was a fortified residence and administrative centre. David Kennedy suggests it may also have served as a point of contact with regional nomads. Archaeologists who excavated the site in the 1980s and a later conservation team have interpreted it as a cavalry fort.

In Arabic, castrum became qasr and was applied to the placenames of many of Jordan's desert castles. In the 19th century, Swiss traveller Johann Ludwig Burckhardt recorded that he heard local Arabs refer to Castra Praetorii Mobeni and the nearby hill to the north as "Keszour el Besheir" (قصور البشير). Scholars have called a watchtower on that hill "Weli Bser" because of its purpose as a shrine or mosque, where weli or wali refers to a Muslim holy person. According to a local oral tradition of a nomad recorded by British poet and adventurer Charles Montagu Doughty, Weli Bser venerated a local holy person, Sheykh Besîr, from which the fort and tower derived their name. However, French priest Joseph Germer-Durand proposed another etymology derived from the Arabic term بشارة (transliterated phonetically by Germer-Durand as "Bécharra") meaning Annunciation. He suggested that this name recalled an original purpose of both the fort and nearby watchtower as elevated signalling stations along the Roman Empire's eastern frontier. The fort itself is now widely known as Qasr Bshir.

== History ==
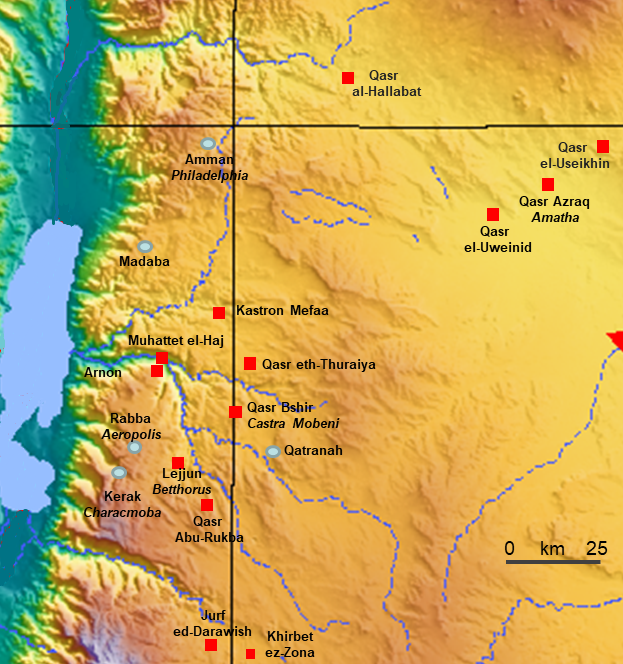
The Limes Arabicus in Jordan

In 106 AD, the Roman Empire annexed the region from the Nabataean Kingdom, establishing it as the province of Arabia with Bostra as its capital. The fort was built between 293 and 305 AD, during the Tetrarchy, when the empire was divided between four emperors, as a part of an extensive network of watchtowers and outlying strongholds known as the Limes Arabicus defending the side east of the Via Traiana Nova. Aside from its defensive role, the fort facilitated control of roads, water sources, and trade routes across the region.

The fort's garrison likely slept in rooms directly above their horses. Other livestock were used as provision, including goats, sheep, cattle, and chickens. Animals foraged on weeds like catchfly and Phalaris, along with locally farmed barley. The soldiers ate lentils, wheat, and barley, supplemented by rations of wine, vinegar, oil, and salt. The fort's unrecorded garrison was possibly a cavalry unit from ala II Miliarensis stationed near the Wadi Mujib.

Today, Qasr Bshir lies where the arid Jordanian Highlands transition into the Syrian Desert, but there was greater rainfall during classical antiquity, and evidence of agriculture in antiquity. Based on excavations in the courtyard of nearby Betthorus, where meals were cooked over open fires fuelled by dung, the garrison's diet likely also included grapes, dates, and olives.

An earthquake devastated Petra and destroyed buildings at Betthorus in 363 AD, likely affecting Qasr Bshir as well. Rome abandoned these fortifications before the end of the 5th century, entrusting the defence of its frontier to the foederati, Arab tribes who had treaties with the empire. Centuries later, during the Umayyad period, Arabs reoccupied the abandoned fort, possibly as a caravanserai; pottery, animal remains, and a single Umayyad coin confirm some activity from the 7th to the mid-8th century. The barracks surrounding the central courtyard collapsed after a 747 earthquake, and the site was not reoccupied, except by occasional transient squatters.

Some time after 1900, a cistern in the courtyard was deliberately rendered unusable, possibly by feuding tribes or by the Ottoman Turkish Army during World War I. Animal carcasses were thrown into it, and it was blocked with stones taken from the ruins.

== Structure ==
The original building plan of Castra Praetorii Mobeni as reconstructed by Brünnow & Domaszewski, with corrections from architect Bert De Vries: Standing walls; Reconstructed walls; Interior spaces; Outdoor spaces

When approached from the desert steppe to the south, the fort rises into view on the plateau, with no other nearby settlements. Qasr Bshir is nearly square, with sides ranging from 55.45 to 57.05 metres. The main entrance faces southwest, flanked by two towers. Above the arched entrance, a lintel bears the dedicatory inscription in Latin. At each corner is a large square tower, with a discreet postern gate piercing the curtain wall at the foot of the western tower. The vaulted passageway of this secondary gate leads through the 1.5-metre-thick wall into the inner courtyard.

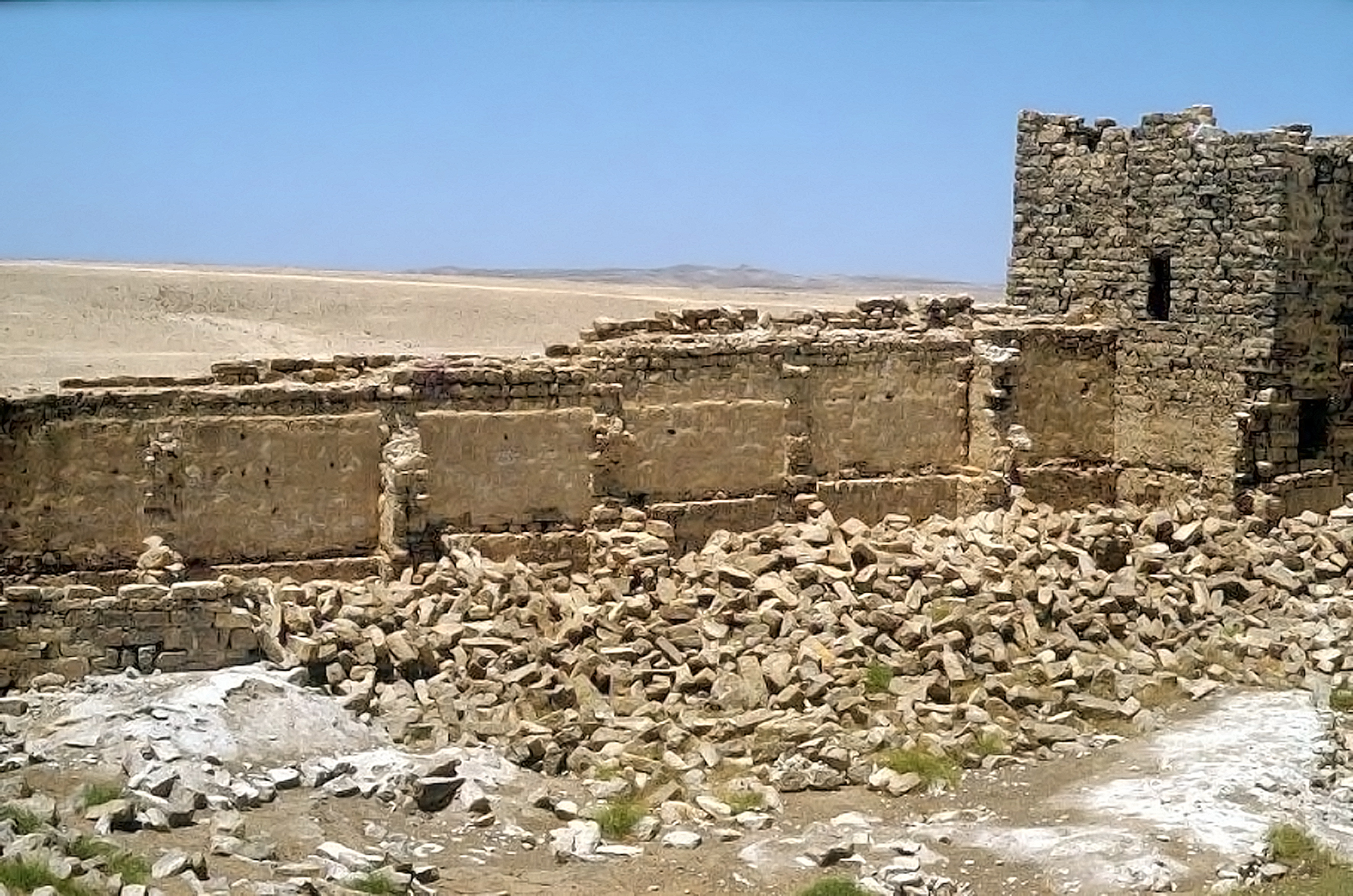
Inner facing of the northwest wall with cross-walls extending into the courtyard

Inside, two cisterns occupied the central courtyard. The ground floor rooms ringing the inner wall were partitioned by load-bearing cross-walls, some still standing. All but three of these rooms attached to the outer wall likely served as stables, each with three flat-bottomed cupboard-like niches built into the outer wall about 70 centimetres (28 in) above the floor. Clark suggests these once held wooden feeding troughs. Opposite the main entrance, a double-height room with a rectangular structure projecting into the courtyard likely served as the principia, or fort headquarters. Above the stables, a second storey of plastered rooms also ringed the fort, clinging to the outer wall. These plastered rooms for the garrison were likely accessed from elevated walkways supported by pillars.

The four corner towers, oriented towards the cardinal directions, rise to about 10 metres high. Each three-room floor is connected by a narrow staircase that winds at sharp angles anticlockwise upwards. The second floors have embrasures, narrow openings where defenders could shoot outward. Only the topmost floors have small windows for ventilation and light. The stairs would have gone all the way to a flat top, which archaeologists suggest could have been a surveillance and signalling platform. Doorways opened from the towers onto the elevated walkways for the second-floor rooms, and also onto their flat roofs, which could have served as a fighting platform behind the outer wall that tapers upward and once terminated in crenellated ramparts. Two smaller towers flanked the main gate. Lacking interior stone stairs, these two may have once housed wooden structures.

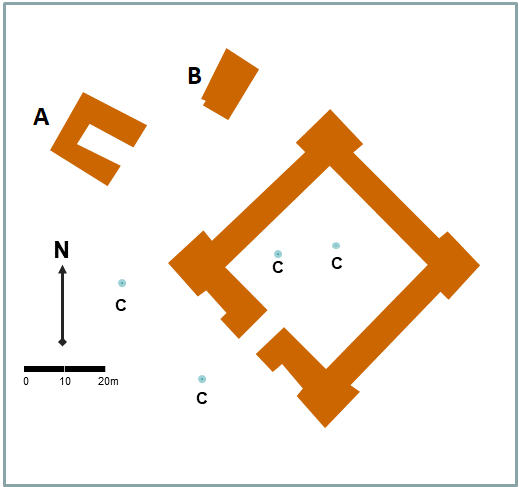
Site plan of the fort with the following labelled near and around the fort: 1. Structure built on an older tower; 2. Razed building; 3. Cisterns

West of the fort, the remains of two buildings lie in its shadow. The first has been completely razed; only the ground plan of its walls remains. The other incorporates the remains of an earlier square Nabataean tower into a Roman structure. Its rectangular arrangement has rooms along three sides and an inner courtyard open towards the fort on the fourth side. The next closest building, some 336 metres to the north, is another former Nabataean watchtower from the pre-Roman Arab kingdom, much later converted into a mosque or shrine.

Beyond the walls, the fort's two courtyard cisterns were supplemented by three more just outside the structure and by a reservoir a few hundred metres away. This reservoir was built contemporaneously with the fort on the opposite slope, and fed by a diverted wadi channelled through a low masonry wall. Its depth is unknown due to silt accumulation. The only other nearby sites are cemeteries.

Qasr Bshir is one of the best-preserved examples of a castellum or small Roman fort. Samuel Thomas Parker identifies it as the best example of a quadriburgium, a small, square-plan fort with corner towers and living quarters built against the ramparts. This design, typical of garrisons housing small detachments, appears at military sites around the former Roman Empire's borders, including Aqua Viva in North Africa and Irgenhausen Castrum in European Raetia. The architectural style is typical in the late 3rd and 4th centuries.

== Archaeology ==
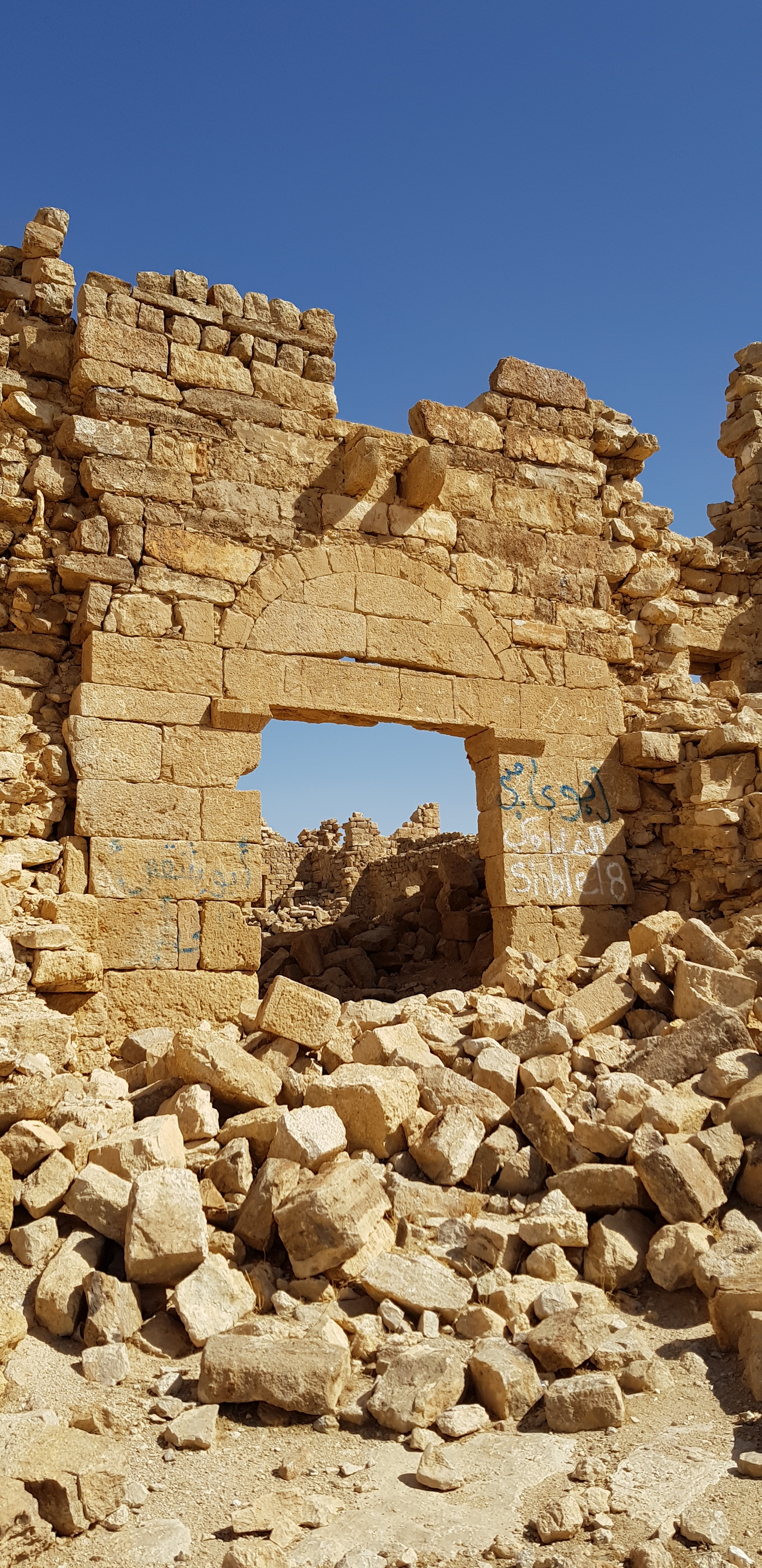
Main entrance of Qasr Bshir in 2018, with Roman inscription and modern graffiti

In the late 19th century, Western travellers recorded a Latin inscription above the fort's entrance, framed within a tabula ansata (a Roman tablet with dovetail handles):

Optimis maximisque principibus nostris Gaio Aurelio Valerio Diocletiano Pio Felici Invicto Augusto et Marco Aurelio Valerio Maximiano Pio Felici Invicto Augusto et Flavio Valerio Constantio et Galerio Valerio Maximiano nobilissimis Caesaribus Castra Praetorii Mobeni a fundamentis Aurelius Asclepiades praeses provinciae Arabiae perfici curavit.

To our Best and Greatest Rulers, Gaius Aurelius Valerius Diocletian, Pious, Fortunate, Unconquered Augustus, and Marcus Aurelius Valerius Maximianus, Pious, Fortunate, Unconquered Augustus, and Flavius Valerius Constantius and Galerius Valerius Maximianus, Most Noble Caesars. Aurelius Asclepiades, Praeses of the Province of Arabia commanded that Castra Praetorium Mobene (?) be constructed from the foundations.

— David Kennedy (trans.), Inscription (293–305 AD)

The dedication to the four tetrarchs dates the fort's foundation to between 293 and 305 AD. In 1897 and 1898, historians Rudolf Ernst Brünnow and Alfred von Domaszewski of Heidelberg University studied the site and produced a detailed plan.

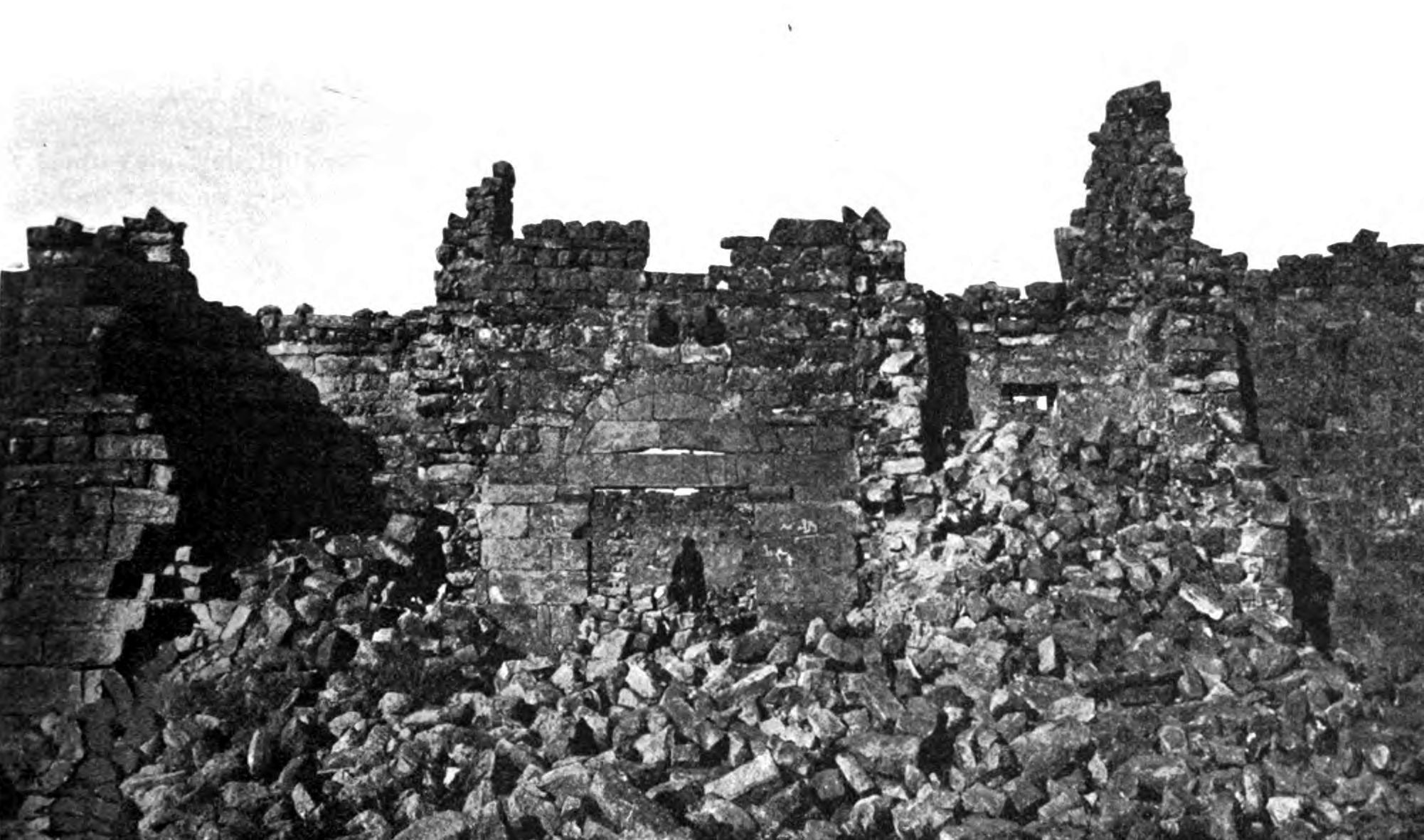
Qasr Bshir's main gate c. 1898 seen from the courtyard

From 1980 to 1989, archaeologists of the Central Limes Arabicus Project studied the sector east of the Dead Sea as an integrated military network centred on the large camp at Betthorus, with watchtowers and small forts, placing Qasr Bshir within this strategic context. Two excavation campaigns took place at the site in 1982 and 1985.

The 1982 campaign involved two test trenches. The first cleared the vaulted exit of the postern to its foundations, exposing the courtyard's original hard mortar-like floor. The second, in a room on the southwest side, reached bedrock and unearthed two Roman pottery sherds. Alongside the excavations, archaeologists studied how the Romans would have communicated with Betthorus over a dozen kilometres away by connecting manned outposts on the Limes, including Qasr Bshir and the nearby watchtower Qasr Abu el-Kharaq. They used smoke signals, mirrors, and torches to test how effectively messages could travel along the frontier, finding that, although winds could hinder smoke visibility, mirrors were visible within 5 kilometres (3.1 mi) during the day and torches were visible up to 10 kilometres (6.2 mi) at night.

A 1985 campaign revealed the courtyard had been illicitly excavated since 1982, with stratigraphic layers churned down to the bedrock and mixed with modern debris, including cigarette butts. Four new trenches were opened: H3 uncovered feeding troughs, confirming rooms as stables; H4 targeted a cistern but was abandoned due to hazardous conditions; H5 in the unexplored building near the fort revealed a Roman structure at the site of an earlier Nabataean tower; and H6 exposed a stone pillar (1.26 metres (4.1 ft) high and 1.80 metres (5.9 ft) from the inner stable wall) that could have supported an upper-level walkway for access to second-floor rooms.

These excavations yielded a detailed fort plan and supporting evidence for the fort's purpose as housing a cavalry unit, with stables for about 69 horses. This is only half a Roman cavalry unit, leaving several possibilities: horses were stabled in the courtyard, pastured outside the walls, distributed among nearby outposts, or the unit was split between garrison and mounted patrol duties.

Nearly all of the excavated Roman coins that archaeologists dated came from the 4th century and none from the 5th. Animal remains (including goats, sheep, camels, poultry, and other mammals) span the 4th and 5th centuries. The small number of overall artefacts that dated to the 5th century could be the result of squatter occupation prior to complete abandonment. No occupation traces exist between the mid-5th century and the Umayyad period, followed by prolonged abandonment.

External image
- Aerial view (14 May 1998)

Since 1997, Jordan has authorised aerial archaeological surveys with the Royal Jordanian Air Force, the Jordanian Department of Antiquities, and the Council for British Research in the Levant. These efforts produced aerial imagery of the fort amid the barren steppe. Declassified Cold War spy-satellite photographs became available for study in 1995. Though lacking the details of aerial photography, the first-generation US CORONA satellites generated legible images of the Limes Arabicus, including Qasr Bshir's walls, towers, courtyard, Weli Bser, and the nearby reservoir. Higher resolution imagery opened up additional possibilities for remote sensing research.

In September 2000, the 18th Congress of Roman Frontier Studies convened in Jordan, with attendees visiting Qasr Bshir and generating significant scholarly attention. On 18 June 2001, Jordan inscribed the castellum on its national Tentative List as a cultural site, the first step toward UNESCO World Heritage designation.

Comparisons between Brünnow and Domaszewski's late 19th-century descriptions and recent observations reveal substantial deterioration. The western tower's exterior walls have partially collapsed, another tower supported by a single remaining cornerstone is in danger of collapse, the lintel above the entrance (bearing the dedicatory inscription) now threatens to fall, and the entrance has been defaced with graffiti. In response to this degradation, the Qasr Bshir Conservation Project was launched in late 2022.

External videos
- 3D scan of Qasr Bshir (2024)

Led by David Breeze, Mark Driessen of Leiden University, and Fawzi Abudanah of Al-Hussein Bin Talal University, under the patronage of Prince Hassan bin Talal, the project has focused initially on stabilising the entrance gate's dedicatory inscription, which had cracked in two places. A 3D scan of the fort's exterior has been completed, with a full surface and subsurface scan planned. The project works alongside local farming and Bedouin communities, whose involvement is considered essential to its long-term sustainability.
