= Machicolation =

Floor-opening between the supporting corbels of a battlement

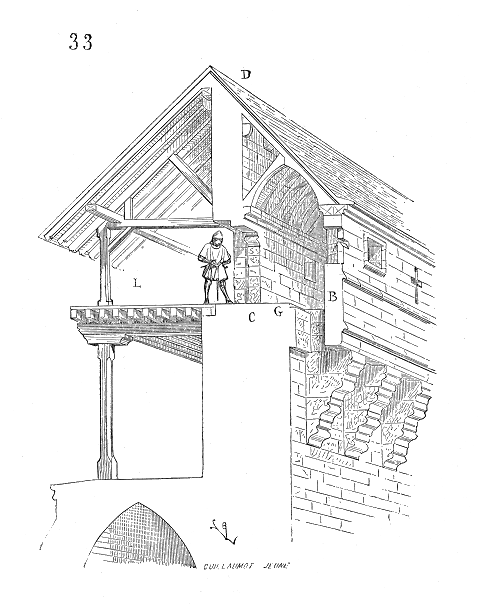
- Cutaway of a medieval wall. The machicolation is labelled G.

In architecture, a machicolation (French: mâchicoulis) is an opening between the supporting corbels of a battlement through which defenders can target attackers who have reached the base of the defensive wall. A smaller related structure that only protects key points of a fortification is referred to as a bretèche. Machicolation, hoarding, bretèches, and murder holes are all similar defensive features serving the same purpose: to enable defenders atop a defensive structure to target attackers below. The primary benefit of the design is to allow defenders to remain behind cover rather than being exposed when leaning over the parapet. They were common in defensive fortifications until the widespread adoption of gunpowder weapons made them obsolete.

== Etymology ==
The word machicolation derives from Old French machecol, mentioned in Medieval Latin as machecollum, probably from Old French machier 'crush', 'wound' and col 'neck'. The verb Machicolate is first recorded in English in the 18th century, but machicollāre is attested in Anglo-Latin.

== Origins and regional prevalence ==
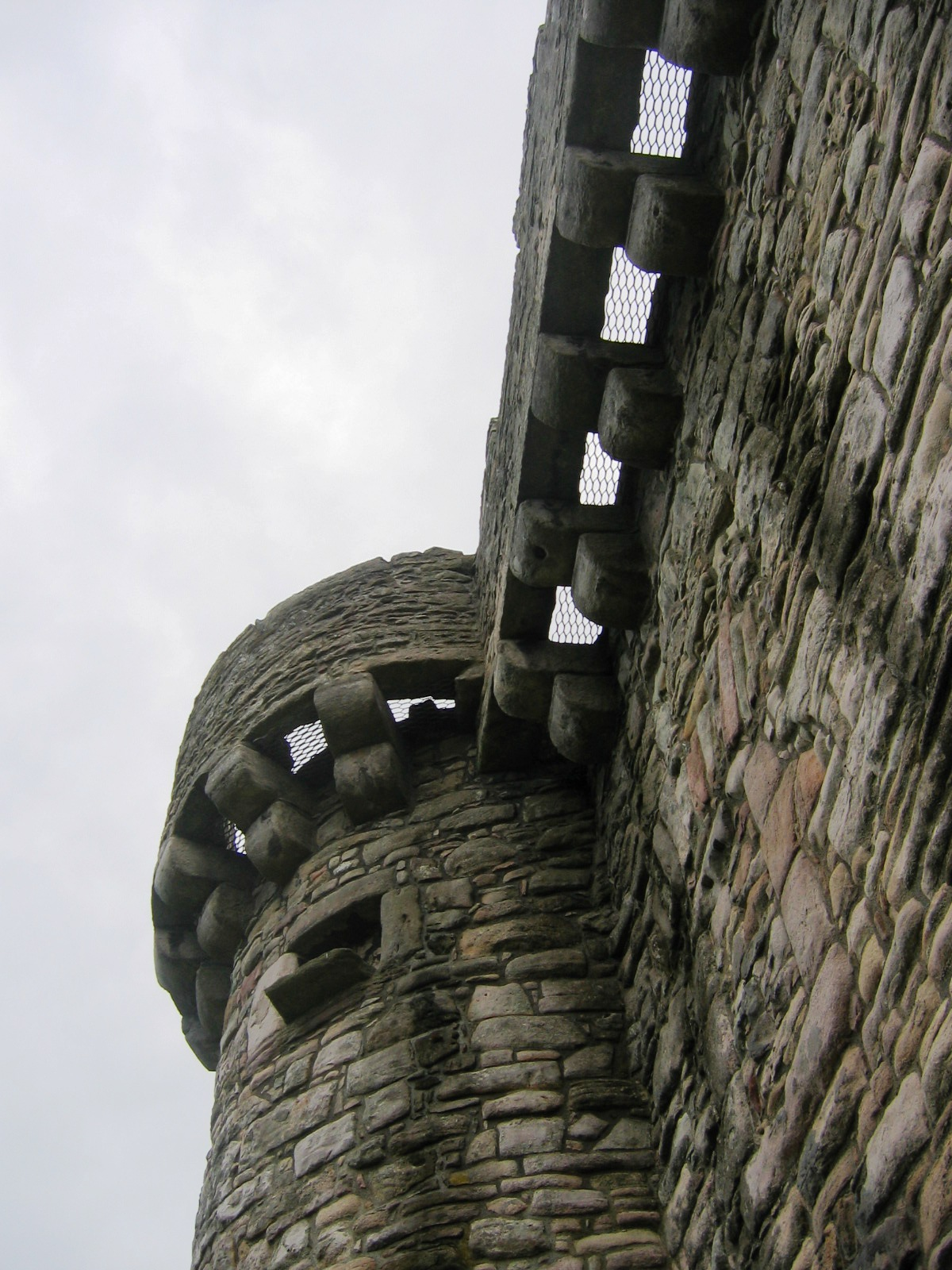
15th-century machicolations of Craigmillar Castle in Scotland

The oldest known buildings with machicolation are Ancient Roman fortifications of the Limes Arabicus, such as Qasr Bshir and Qasr al-Hallabat, dating from the 4th century AD. The design was brought to Europe from the Levant following the crusades and became especially prevalent in Southern Europe.

Machicolations were more common in French castles than English, where they are usually restricted to the gateway, as in the 13th-century Conwy Castle. Within France, machicolation is more common on southern castles. One of the oldest extant examples of machicolation in northern France is at Château de Farcheville, which was built from 1290 to 1304.

Annotated sketch of an Italian battlement

== See also ==
- Arrow slit
- Defensive walls
- Garderobe
- Jettying
- Murder hole
- Parapet
