= Lejjun =

Lejjun ot Lajjun (common English spelling versions), or with definite article (el-Lejjun, al-Lajjun), may refer to one of two settlements which developed in association with ancient Roman legionary camps (legio) in the southern Levant:

- Lajjun (Arabic: اللجّون, al-Lajjûn), former Palestinian Arab village; continuation of settlement next to Legio, the camp of Legio VI Ferrata at the exit of Wadi Ara, 1 km (0.62 mi) south of the remains of biblical Megiddo in Israel
- Betthorus, a fortress of the Legio IV Martia on the Limes Arabicus, later El-Lejjun, Karak Governorate, Jordan, north-east of Karak
