= Limes Arabicus =

Desert frontier of the Roman Empire

The Limes Arabicus was a desert frontier of the Roman Empire, running north from its start in the province of Arabia Petraea. It ran northeast from the Gulf of Aqaba for about 1,500 kilometers (930 mi) at its greatest extent, reaching northern Syria and forming part of the wider Roman limes system. It had several forts and watchtowers.

The reason of this defensive limes was to protect the Roman province of Arabia from attacks of the nomadic tribes of the Arabian desert. The main purpose of the Limes Arabicus is disputed; it may have been used both to defend from Arab raids and to protect the commercial trade routes from robbers.

Next to the Limes Arabicus Emperor Trajan built a major road, the Via Nova Traiana, from Bosra to Aila on the Red Sea, a distance of 430 km (270 mi). Built between 111 and 114 AD, its primary purpose may have been to provide efficient transportation for troop movements and government officials as well as facilitating and protecting trade caravans emerging from the Arabian Peninsula. It was completed under Emperor Hadrian.

== Fortification ==
During the Severan dynasty (AD 193–235), the Romans strengthened their defences on the Arabian frontier. They constructed several castra (forts) at the northwest end of the Wadi Sirhan, and improved the roads. One important fort was Qasr Azraq, another was at Humeima (Latin: Auara), from the late 2nd century AD, on the Via Traiana Nova from Petra to Aila, where up to 500 auxiliary troops could have resided. It was probably abandoned in the fourth century.

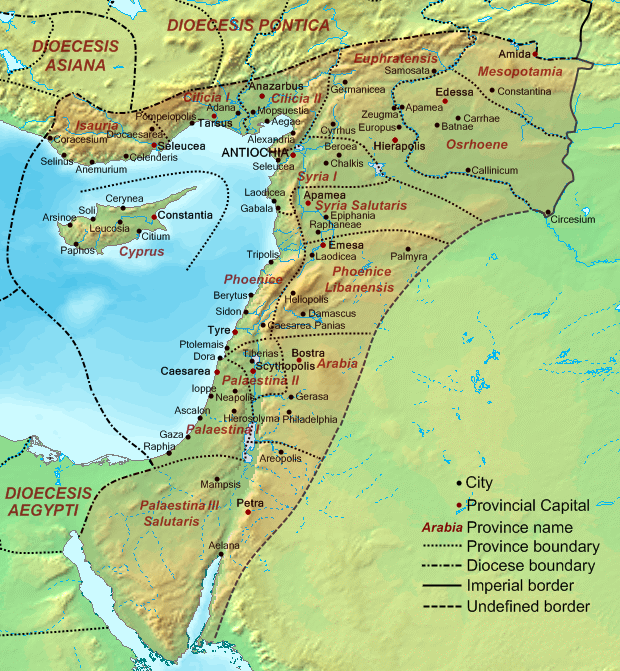
Diocese of the East around 400 AD

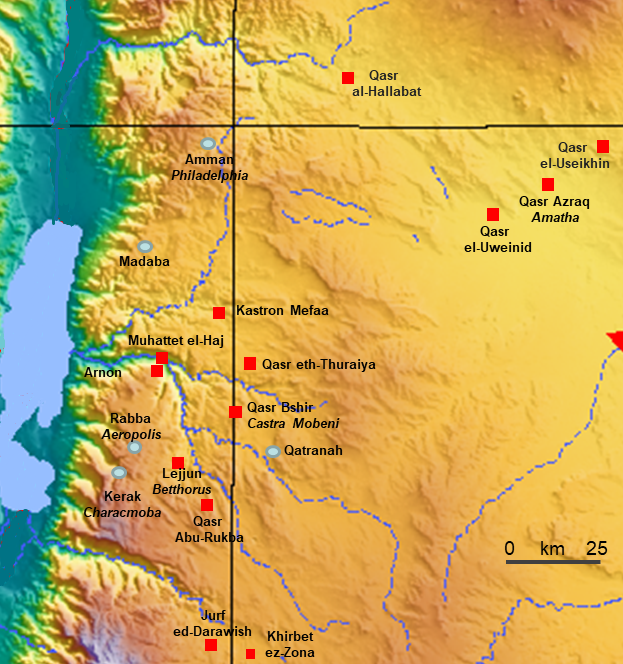
Limes arabicus, central part in Jordan.

Praetorium Mobeni (Qasr Bshir): a late Roman quadriburgium in Jordan

Emperor Diocletian partitioned the old province of Arabia by transferring the southern region to the province of Palaestina. Later in the 4th century, Palaestina was made into three provinces, and the southern one was eventually called Palaestina Tertia. Each province was administered by a praeses with civil authority and a dux with military authority.

Diocletian engaged in a major military expansion in the region, building a number of castella, watchtowers, and fortresses along the fringe of the desert just east of the Via Nova. This line of defence extended from south of Damascus to Wadi al-Hasa. The region from Wadi Mujib to Wadi al-Hasa contained four castella and a legionary camp. The frontier south of Wadi al-Hasa, which extended to the Red Sea at Aila (Aqaba), may have been called the Limes Palaestina. In this region, ten castella and a legionary camp have been identified. The term may have referred to a series of fortifications and roads in the northern Negev, running from Rafah on the Mediterranean to the Dead Sea, or to the region under the military control of the dux Palaestinae, the military governor of the Palaestinian provinces.

== Personnel ==
There were castra every 100 kilometres (62 mi) with the purpose to create a line of protection and control: in the south there was the legionary fortress at Adrou (Udruh), just east of Petra. It probably housed the Legio VI Ferrata, which was moved from Lajjun (in modern-day Israel) by Diocletian. It is similar to Betthorus (al-Lajjun in modern-day Jordan) in size (4.9 hectares (12 acres)) and design, and is in the plain of Moab, south of Wadi Mujib . Alistair Killick, who excavated the site, dates it to the early 2nd century, but Parker suggests a date in the late 3rd or early 4th century.

A legionary camp may have also existed at Aila (modern Aqaba), which has been excavated by Parker since 1994. The city was located at the north end of the Gulf of Aqaba where it was a centre of sea traffic. Several land routes also intersected here. Legio X Fretensis, originally stationed in Jerusalem, was transferred here to the terminus of the Via Nova. So far, a stone curtain wall and projecting tower have been identified, but it is uncertain whether they were part of the city wall of Aila or the fortress. The evidence suggests the fort was constructed in the late 4th or early 5th century.

Troops were progressively withdrawn from the Limes Arabicus in the first half of the 6th century and replaced with native Arab foederati, chiefly the Ghassanids. After the Muslim Arab conquest, the Limes Arabicus was largely left to disappear, though some fortifications were used and reinforced in the following centuries.

== History ==
The limes was overrun in 611 during the war with the Sasanians.

== See also ==
- Strata Diocletiana
- Roman Arabia
- Via Traiana Nova
- Sassanian defense lines#Wall of the Arabs
- Walls-of-the-Ruler

== Bibliography ==
- Gichon, Mordechai (1991). "When And Why Did The Romans Commence The Defence of Southern Palestine". In Maxfield, V.A.; Dobson, M. J. (eds.). Roman Frontier Studies 1989 – Proceedings of the XVth International Congress of Roman Frontier Studies. Exeter: University of Exeter Press. pp. 318–325.
- Graf, D. The Via Militaris and the Limes Arabicus in "Roman Frontier Studies 1995": Proceedings of the XVIth International Congress of Roman Frontier Studies, ed. W. Groenman-van Waateringe, B. L. van Beek, W. J. H. Willems, and S. L. Wynia. Oxbow Monograph 91. Oxford: Oxbow Books.
- Gregory, Shelagh, Kennedy, David and Stein, Aurel, Sir Aurel Stein's Limes Report: Part 1 & 2 (British Archaeological Reports (BAR), 1985)
- Gregory, S. Was There an Eastern Origin for the Design of Late Roman Fortifications?: Some Problems for Research on Forts of Rome's Eastern Frontier in "The Roman Army in the East", ed. D. L. Kennedy. Journal of Roman Archaeology Supplementary Series, 18. Ann Arbor, MI: Journal of Roman Archaeology.
- Isaac, B. The Limits of Empire: The Roman Army in the East Clarendon Press. Oxford, 1990.
- Parker, S.T. (1986). Romans and Saracens: A History of the Arabian Frontier. American Schools of Oriental Research.
- Parker, S. The Roman Frontier in Central Jordan Interim Report on the Limes Arabicus Project, 1980–1985. BAR International Series, 340. British Archaeological Reports. Oxford, 1987
- Young, Gary K. Rome's Eastern Trade: International commerce and imperial policy, 31 BC – AD 305 Routledge. London, 2001
- Welsby, D. Qasr al-Uwainid and Da'ajaniya: Two Roman Military Sites in Jordan Levant 30: 195–8. Oxford, 1990
