= Brünnow =

Brünnow may refer to:

- 6807 Brünnow, a minor planet
- Franz Brünnow, a German astronomer
- Rudolf Ernst Brünnow (1858–1917), German-American orientalist and philologist
