= Fourth Legion =

4th Legion may refer to:

- Legio IV Macedonica founded in 48 BC
- Legio IV Scythica founded c. 42 BC by the general Mark Antony
- Legio IV Flavia Felix founded in AD 70 by the emperor Vespasian from the ashes of the Legio IV Macedonica
- Legio IV Martia
- Legio IV Italica founded in AD 231 by emperor Alexander Severus
