= Abu al-Faraj al-Isfahani =

Arab historian, writer, poet and musicologist (897–967)

- أَبُو الْفَرَج الْأصْفَهَانِيّ
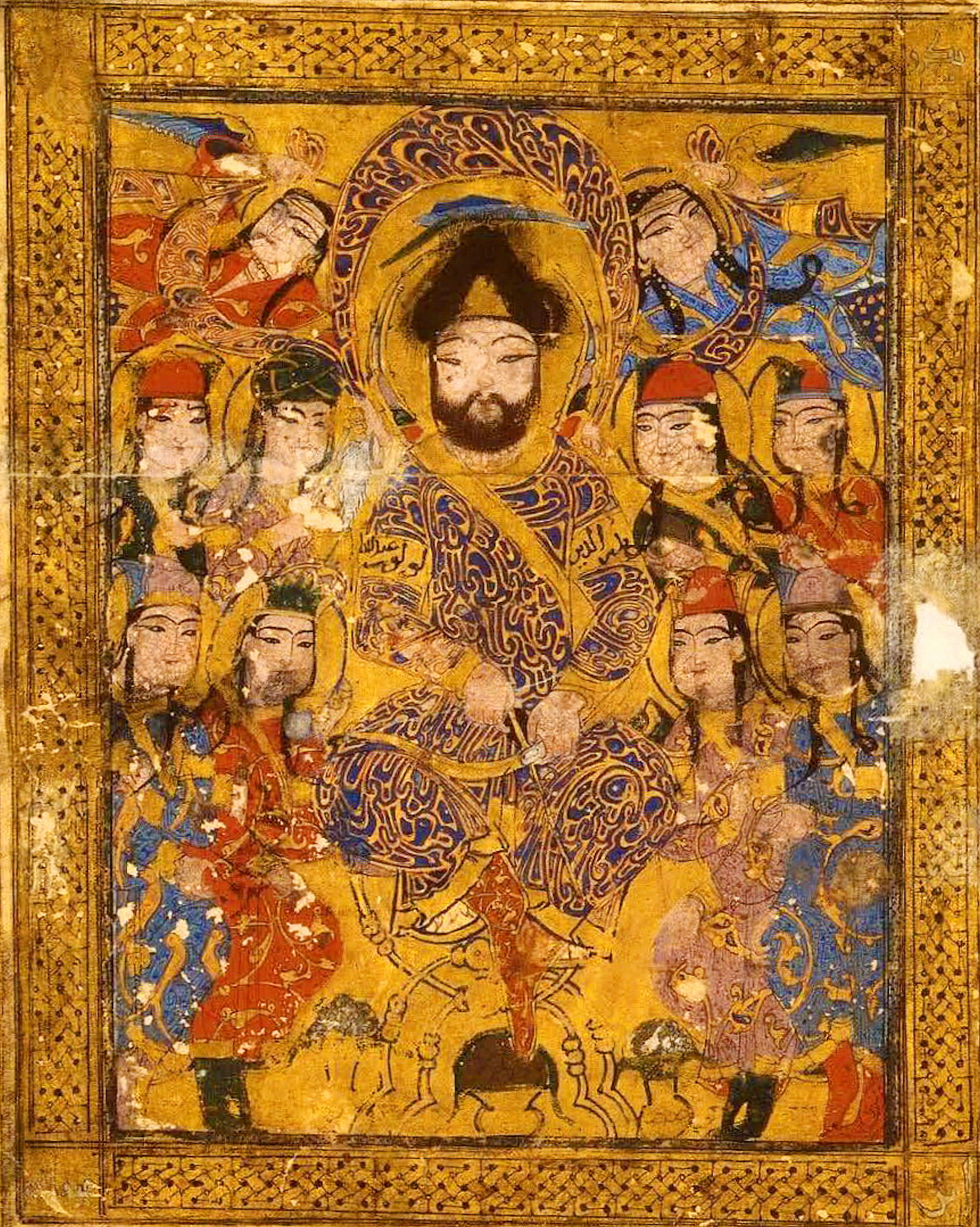
- Illustration from Kitab al-aghani (Book of Songs), 1216–20, by Abu al-Faraj al-Isfahani, a collection of songs by famous musicians and Arab poets.
- Born: 897; Isfahan, Abbasid Caliphate
- Died: 967 (aged 69–70) (Note: See the section on Dates); Baghdad
- Other name: Ali ibn al-Ḥusayn ibn Muḥammad ibn Aḥmad ibn al-Ḥaytham al-Umawī al-Marwānī
- Era: Islamic golden age (Abbasid era)
- Known for: Book of Songs
- Scientific career
- Fields: History
- Patrons: Sayf ad-Dawlah

Ali ibn al-Husayn al-Iṣfahānī (Arabic: أبو الفرج الأصفهاني), also known as Abul-Faraj, (full form: Abū al-Faraj ʿAlī ibn al-Ḥusayn ibn Muḥammad ibn Aḥmad ibn al-Ḥaytham al-Umawī al-Marwānī al-Iṣfahānī) (897–967CE / 284–356AH) was a writer, historian, genealogist, poet, musicologist and scribe. He was of Arab-Quraysh origin and mainly based in Baghdad. He is best known as the author of Kitab al-Aghani ("The Book of Songs"), which includes information about the earliest attested periods of Arabic music (from the seventh to the ninth centuries) and the lives of poets and musicians from the pre-Islamic period to al-Isfahani's time. Given his contribution to the documentation of the history of Arabic music, al-Isfahani is characterised by George Sawa as "a true prophet of modern ethnomusicology".

== Dates ==
The commonly accepted dates of al-Isfahani's birth and death are 897–898 and 967, based on the dates given by al-Khatib al-Baghdadi which itself based its information on the testimony of al-Isfahani's student, Muhammad ibn Abi al-Fawaris. (Note: Other dates of death are in the 360s/970s and 357/967–68, suggested respectively by Ibn al-Nadim (d. 385/995 or 388/998) and Abu Nu'aym al-Isfahani (336–430/948–1038)) However, the credibility of these dates is to be treated with caution. No source places his death earlier than 967, but several place it later. These dates are at odds with a reference in the Kitab Adab al-ghuraba ("The Book of the Etiquettes of Strangers"), attributed to al-Isfahani, to his being in the prime of youth (fi ayyam al-shabiba wa-l-siba) in 967. (Note: The attribution of Adab al-ghuraba to al-Isfahani is much disputed in current scholarship. The scholars who affirm al-Isfahani as the author of Adab al-ghuraba include: On the opposite side are:) Calculation of the approximate dates of his birth and death through the life spans of his students and his direct informants suggests that he was born before 902 and died after 960.

== Biography ==
Abu al-Faraj al-Isfahani was born in Isfahan, Persia (present-day Iran) but spent his youth and undertook his early studies in Baghdad (present-day Iraq). He was a direct descendant of the last of the Umayyad caliphs, Marwan II, (Note: Al-Isfahani traced his descent to Marwan II as follows: Abu al-Faraj Ali ibn al-Husayn ibn Muhammad ibn Ahmad ibn al-Haytham ibn Abd al-Rahman ibn Marwan ibn Abd Allah ibn Marwan II ibn Muhammad ibn Marwan I.) and was thus connected with the Umayyad rulers in al-Andalus, and seems to have kept up a correspondence with them and to have sent them some of his works. He became famous for his knowledge of early Arabian antiquities.

His later life was spent in various parts of the Islamic world, including in Aleppo with its Hamdanid governor Sayf ad-Dawlah (to whom he dedicated the Book of Songs), and in Ray with the Buwayhid vizier Ibn 'Abbad.

=== Family ===
The epithet, al-Isfahani, (Note: Another spelling, al-Isbahani, is also used in secondary literature. Although al-Isbahani is found in the oldest biographical sources and manuscripts, al-Isfahani will be used in this article.) refers to the city, Isfahan, on the Iranian plateau. Instead of indicating al-Isfahani's birthplace, (Note: This misconception, according to Azarnoosh, was first disseminated by Ṭāshkubrīzādah (d. 968/1560) and was thereafter followed by modern scholars. Despite the epithet, al-Isfahani, the Isfahani family did not have a strong connection with the city of Isfahan. Rather, the family was mainly based in Sāmarrāʾ, from the generation of al-Isfahani's grandfather Ahmad b. al-Ḥaytham, and then Baghdad.) this epithet seems to be common to al-Isfahani's family. Every reference al-Isfahani makes to his paternal relatives includes the attributive, al-Isfahani. According to Ibn Hazm (994–1064), some descendants of the last Umayyad caliph, Marwan b. Muhammad (691–750), al-Isfahani's ancestor, (Note: While most of the sources agree that al-Isfahani was amongst the offspring of the last Umayyad caliph, Marwan b. Muhammad, Ibn al-Nadīm alone claimed that he was a descendant of Hishām b. ʿAbd al-Malik (72–125/691–743). The majority opinion:) settled in Isfahan. The earliest information available regarding al-Isfahani's family history dates to the generation of his great-grandfather, Ahmad b. al-Ḥaytham, who settled in Samarra sometime between 835–6 and 847.

Based on al-Isfahani's references in the Kitab al-Aghani (hereafter, the Aghani), Ahmad b. al-Haytham led a privileged life in Sāmarrāʾ, while his sons were well-connected with the elite of the Abbasid capital at that time. (Note: A report in the Aghani mentions Ahmad b. al-Ḥaytham's possession of slaves, which may indicate his being wealthy.) His son, Abd al-Aziz b. Ahmad, was "one of the high ranking scribes in the days of al-Mutawakkil (r. 847–861) (min kibār al-kuttāb fī ayyām al-Mutawakkil)". Another son, Muhammad b. Ahmad (viz. al-Isfahani's grandfather), was associated with Abbasid officials, the vizier Ibn al-Zayyāt (d. 847), the scribe Ibrahim b. al-Abbas al-Ṣūlī (792–857), and the vizier Ubaydallah b. Sulayman (d. 901), along with the Ṭālibid notables, including al-Husayn b. al-Husayn b. Zayd, who was the leader of the Banu Hashim. The close ties with the Abbasid court continued with Muhammad's sons, al-Hasan and al-Husayn (al-Isfahani's father).

In various places in the Aghani, al-Isfahani refers to Yahya b. Muhammad b. Thawaba (from the Al Thawaba) as his grandfather on his mother's side. (Note: For the identity of Yahya b. Muhammad b. Thawaba and other members of the Al Thawaba, see:) It is often suggested that the family of Thawaba, being Shi'i, (Note: The term, Shi'i, is used in its broadest sense in this article and comprises various still evolving groups, including Imami Shi'is, Zaydīs, Ghulāt, and mild or soft Shi'is (as per van Ess and Crone), as well as those who straddle several sectarian alignments. Such inclusiveness is necessitated by the lack of clear-cut sectarian delineation (as in the case of the Al Thawaba, discussed here) in the early period.) bequeathed their sectarian inclination to al-Isfahani. (Note: Both Kilpatrick and Azarnoosh follow Khalafallāh's argument as to the Al Thawaba's impact upon al-Isfahani's Shi'i conviction.) The identification of the Thawaba family as Shi'is is solely found in a late source, Yaqut's (1178–1225) work. While many elite families working under the Abbasid caliphate were Shi'i-inclined, indeed allied with Alids or their partisans, there is no evidence that members of the Thawaba family embraced an extreme form of Shi'ism.

In the seats of the caliphate, a few members of the al-Isfahani family worked as scribes, while maintaining friendship or alliance with other scribes, viziers and notables. Like many of the court elite, al-Isfahani's family maintained an amicable relationship with the offspring of Ali and allied with families, such as the Thawaba family, (Note: Besides the Al Thawaba, one may count among the pro-Alid or Shi'i families the Banū Furāt and Banū Nawbakht.) sharing their veneration of Ali and Alids. There is no indication of a reverential attitude towards Alids in terms of sectarian alignment, given the scanty information about al-Isfahani's family and the fluidity of sectarian identities at the time.

=== Education and career ===
The Isfahani family's extensive network of contacts is reflected in al-Isfahani's sources. Among the direct informants whom al-Isfahani cites in his works, are members of his own family, who were further connected to other notable families, the Al Thawaba, (Note: Al-Isfahani's sources are al-Abbas b. Ahmad b. Thawaba and Yahya b. Muhammad b. Thawaba, al-Isfahani's grandfather from the maternal side, who is cited indirectly.) the Banū Munajjim, (Note: Al-Isfahani has three informants from the Banū Munajjim, whose members were associated with the Abbasid court as boon companions, scholars, or astrologists: Ahmad b. Yahya b. Ali (262–327/876–940); Ali b. Harun b. Ali (277–352/890–963); and Yahya b. Ali b. Yahya (241–300/855–912). About the Banu Munajjim; see:) the Yazīdīs, (Note: The Yazīdīs were famed for its members’ mastery of poetry, the Qurʾānic readings, the ḥadīth, and philology. Muhammad b. al-Abbas al-Yazīdī (d. c. 228–310/842–922) was the tutor of the children of the caliph, al-Muqtadir (r. 295–320/908–932), and transmitted Abu Ubayda's Naqa'id, Thaalab's Majalis, and the works of his family; many of his narrations are preserved in the Aghani.) the Ṣūlīs, (Note: The association with the Ṣūlīs likely began in the generation of al-Isfahani's grandfather, Muhammad b. Ahmad, who was close to Ibrahim b. al-Abbas al-Ṣūlī; see the section on Family. Al-Isfahani's direct sources from this family are the famous al-Ṣūlī, Muhammad b. Yahya (d. 335/946 or 336/947), who was the boon companion of a number of the caliphs and a phenomenal chess player; his son, Yahya b. Muhammad al-Ṣūlī; and al-Abbas b. Ali, known as Ibn Burd al-Khiyār. See: See also:) the Banū Ḥamdūn, (Note: The Banu Hamdun were known for their boon companionship at the Abbasid court in the ninth century; al-Isfahani's informant is Abdallāh b. Ahmad b. Ḥamdūn; about the Banū Ḥamdūn; see:) the Ṭāhirids, (Note: Yahya b. Muhammad b. ʿAbdallāh b. Ṭāhir, identified by al-Isfahani as the nephew of ʿUbaydallāh b. ʿAbdallāh b. Ṭāhir (d. 300/913), is the son of Muhammad b. ʿAbdallāh b. Ṭāhir (d. 296/908–9), the governor of Khurāsān. See also:) the Banū al-Marzubān (Note: Al-Isfahani mentions a conversation between his father and Muhammad b. Khalaf b. al-Marzubānī and notes the long-term friendship and marital tie between the two families; see: I owe this reference to: Muhammad b. Khalaf b. al-Marzubān is a ubiquitous informant in the Aghānī; see:) and the Ṭālibids. (Note: The Ṭālibid informants of al-Isfahani comprise: Ali b. al-Husayn b. Ali b. Hamza; Ali b. Ibrahim b. Muhammad; Ali b. Muhammad b. Ja'far; Ja'far b. Muhammad b. Ja'far; Muhammad b. Ali b. Hamza; see:)

Given that al-Isfahani and his family very likely settled in Baghdad around the beginning of the tenth century, (Note: al-Isfahani's uncle, al-Hasan b. Muhammad, mentioned in the Tarikh Madinat al-Salam, either settled in Baghdad with him or at least active for some time there; see:) he interacted with a considerable number of the inhabitants of or visitors to that city, including: Jaḥẓa (d. 936), al-Khaffāf, Ali b. Sulaymān al-Akhfash (d. 927/8), and Muhammad b. Jarir al-Ṭabari (d. 922). Like other scholars of his time, al-Isfahani travelled in pursuit of knowledge. Although the details are insufficient to establish the dates of his journeys, based on the chains of transmission (asānīd, sing. isnād) al-Isfahani cites consistently and meticulously in every report, it is certain that he transmitted from ʿAbd al-Malik b. Maslama and ʿĀṣim b. Muhammad in Antakya; ʿAbdallāh b. Muhammad b. Ishaq in Ahwaz; and Yahya b. Aḥmad b. al-Jawn in Raqqa. If we accept the attribution of the Kitab Adab al-ghuraba to al-Isfahani, he once visited Baṣra as well as Ḥiṣn Mahdī, Mattūth, and Bājistrā. Yet, none of these cities seems to have left as much of an impact on al-Isfahani as Kūfa and Baghdad did. While al-Isfahani's Baghdadi informants were wide-ranging in their expertise as well as sectarian and theological tendencies, his Kūfan sources can be characterised as either Shi'i or keen on preserving and disseminating memories that favoured Ali and his family. For example, Ibn ʿUqda (d. 944), mentioned in both the Aghānī and the Maqātil, was invariably cited for the reports about the Alids and their merits. (Note: About Ibn ʿUqd, see also:)

The journey in search for knowledge taken by al-Isfahani may not be particularly outstanding by the standard of his time, (Note: Compare, for instance, his teacher, al-Ṭabarī.) but the diversity of his sources' occupations and expertise is impressive. His informants can be assigned into one or more of the following categories: (Note: It has to be kept in mind that the categorisation is based on the attributives given by al-Isfahani. Just as al-Isfahani was not a local Isfahani, the subjects discussed here do not necessarily engage with the professions their nisbas indicate.) philologists and grammarians; singers and musicians; booksellers and copyists (sahhafun or warraqun, sing. sahhaf or Warraq); friends; (Note: See also the footnotes above:) tutors (muʾaddibūn, sing. muʾaddib); scribes (kuttāb, sing. kātib); imams or preachers (khuṭabāʾ, sing. khaṭīb); religious scholars (of the ḥadīth, the Qurʾānic recitations and exegeses, or jurisprudence) and judges; poets; and akhbārīs (transmitters of reports of all sorts, including genealogical, historical, and anecdotal reports). The variety of the narrators and their narrations enriched al-Iṣfahānī's literary output, which covers a wide range of topics from amusing tales to the accounts of the Alids' martyrdom. (Note: See Legacy, below) His erudition is best illustrated by Abu Ali al-Muhassin al-Tanukhi's (941–994) comment: "With his encyclopaedic knowledge of music, musicians, poetry, poets, genealogy, history, and other subjects, al-Iṣfahānī established himself as a learned scholar and teacher."

He was also a scribe and this is not surprising, given his families’ scribal connections, but the details of his kātib activities are rather opaque. (Note: For the few references by al-Isfahani to his administrative tasks, see:) Although both al-Tanūkhī and al-Baghdādī refer to al-Isfahani with the attribute, kātib, they mention nothing of where he worked or for whom. The details of his occupation as a scribe only came later, with Yaqut, many of whose reports about al-Isfahani prove problematic. For instance, a report from Yaqut claims that al-Isfahani was the scribe of Rukn al-Dawla (d. 976) and mentions his resentment towards Abū al-Faḍl b. al-ʿAmīd (d. 970). However, the very same report was mentioned by Abū Ḥayyān al-Tawḥīdī (active tenth century) in his Akhlāq al-wazīrayn, where the scribe of Rukn al-Dawla is identified as Abū al-Faraj Ḥamd b. Muhammad, not Abū al-Faraj al-Isfahani.

Amongst the Shīʿī narrators whom we have seen, none has memorised poems, melodies, reports, traditions (al-āthār), al-aḥādīth al-musnada (narrations with chains of transmission, including the Prophetic ḥadīth), and genealogy by heart like Abū al-Faraj al-Isfahani. Very proficient in these matters, he is also knowledgeable in the military campaigns and the biography of the Prophet (al-maghāzī and al-sīra), lexicography, grammar, legendary tales (al-khurāfāt), and the accomplishments required of courtiers (ālat al-munādama), like falconry (al-jawāriḥ), veterinary science (al-bayṭara), some notions of medicine (nutafan min al-ṭibb), astrology, drinks (al-ashriba), and other things.

— Al-Khaṭīb (Note: It is noteworthy that the first sentence of this quote is written differently from the works given here in al-Khaṭīb's Tārīkh.)

Thus, it is hard to know with certainty how and where al-Isfahani was engaged in his capacity as a kātib. Nevertheless, al-Isfahani's association with the vizier, Abū Muḥammad al-Muhallabī (903–963), is well-documented. The friendship between the two began before al-Muhallabī's became vizier in 950. (Note: Among the frequently cited sources in the Aghānī is Ḥabīb b. Naṣr al-Muhallabī (d. 307/919), presumably from the Muhallabid family, but it is not clear how this informant relates to Abū Muhammad al-Muhallabī; see:) The firm relationship between them is supported by al-Isfahani's poetry collected by al-Thaʿālibī (961–1038): half of the fourteen poems are panegyrics dedicated to al-Muhallabī. In addition, al-Isfahani's own work, al-Imāʾ al-shawāʿir (“Enslaved Women Who Composed Poetry”), is dedicated to the vizier, presumably, al-Muhallabī. His no longer surviving Manājīb al-khiṣyān (“The Noble Eunuchs”), which addresses two castrated male singers owned by al-Muhallabī, was composed for him. His magnum opus, the Aghānī, was very likely intended for al-Muhallabī, as well. (Note: See section on Legacy) In return for his literary efforts, according to al-Tanūkhī, al-Isfahani frequently received rewards from the vizier. Furthermore, for the sake of their long-term friendship and out of his respect for al-Isfahani's genius, al-Muhallabī exceptionally tolerated al-Isfahani's uncouth manners and poor personal hygiene. The sources say nothing about al-Isfahani's fate after al-Muhallabī's death. In his last years, according to his student, Muhammad b. Abī al-Fawāris, he suffered from senility (khallaṭa). (Note: See also:)

=== Personality, preferences, and beliefs ===
As a friend, al-Isfahani was unconventional in the sense that he did not seem to have been bothered to observe the social decorum of his time, as noted by a late biographical source: with his uncleanliness and gluttony, he presented a counterexample to elegance (ẓarf), as defined by one of his teachers, Abu al-Ṭayyib al-Washshāʾ (d. 937). (Note: Al-Washshāʾ says: “It is not permissible for the people of elegance and etiquette to wear dirty clothes with clean ones, or clean ones with new ones,” and they should eat with small morsels, while avoiding gluttony. Al-Isfahani never washed his clothes and shoes and only replaced them when they became too shabby to put on.) His unconformity to the social norms did not hinder him from being part of al-Muhallabī's entourage or participation in the literary assemblies, but, inevitably, it resulted in frictions with other scholars and detraction by his enemies. Although al-Isfahani appeared eccentric to his human associates, he was a caring owner of his cat, named Yaqaq (white): he treated Yaqaq's colic (qulanj) with an enema (al-ḥuqna). (Note: For the discussion of colic and its treatment by enema; see:)

In contrast to his personal habits, al-Isfahani's prose style is lucid, “in clear and simple language, with unusual sincerity and frankness”. (Note: See also:) Al-Isfahani's capacity as a writer is well illustrated by Abu Deeb, who depicts al-Isfahani as "one of the finest writers of Arabic prose in his time, with a remarkable ability to relate widely different types of aḵbār in a rich, lucid, rhythmic, and precise style, only occasionally exploiting such formal effects as saǰʿ (rhyming prose). He was also a fine poet with an opulent imagination. His poetry displays preoccupations similar to those of other urban poets of his time". His pinpoint documentation of asānīd (Note: Al-Isfahani specifies not only his sources (the identities of his informants, or the titles of the written material used by him) but also the methods by which he acquired the reports. Now and then, he mentions the occasions on which he received the given information; see:) and meticulous verification of information, provided in all his works, embody a truly scholarly character. Usually, in his treatment of a subject or an event, al-Isfahani lets his sources speak, but, occasionally, he voices his evaluation of poems and songs, as well as their creators. When dealing with conflicting reports, al-Isfahani either leaves his readers to decide or issues his judgement as to the most credible account. Yet, he frankly condemns sources whom he holds to be unreliable, for instance, Ibn Khurdādhbih on musicological information and Ibn al-Kalbī on genealogy. Indeed, al-Isfahani assesses his source material with a critical eye, while striving to present a more balanced view on his biographies, by focusing on their merits instead of elaborating on their flaws.

That said, al-Isfahani's personal preferences and sectarian partisanship are not absent from his works. In terms of music and songs, al-Isfahani favours Ishaq b. Ibrahim al-Mawsili (772–850). In al-Isfahani's view, Ishaq b. Ibrahim was a multi-talented man, who excelled in a number of subjects, but, most importantly, music. Ishaq b. Ibrahim, as a collector of the reports about poets and singers, is an important source in his Aghānī. Besides being a mine of information, Ishaq b. Ibrahim's terminology for the description of the melodic modes is preferred over that of his opponent, Ibrahim ibn al-Mahdi (779–839), and adopted by al-Isfahani in his Aghani. (Note: See also:) Furthermore, al-Isfahani embarked on the compilation of the Aghānī because he was commissioned by his patron to reconstruct the list of the exquisite songs selected by Ishaq. (Note: See the section on al-Iṣfahānī’s works.) In other words, the raison d’etre of the Aghānī is partly related to al-Isfahani's idol, Ishaq b. Ibrahim, and its information about singers, songs and performance owes a tremendous amount to him. Al-Isfahani's admiration for scholars or men of letters can be detected from time to time, usually in the passing comments in the chains of transmission. Yet al-Isfahani outspokenly expresses his admiration, in some cases, such as that of Ibn al-Muʿtazz (862–909).

As an Umayyad by ancestry, al-Isfahani's later biographers mention his Shi'i affiliation with surprise. (Note: The earliest mention of the Umayyad-Shi'i combination in the biographical sources is perhaps: This is then repeated in later sources; see) Yet, in the light of the history of the family's connections with the Abbasid elite of Shi'i inclination and the Ṭālibids, and of his learning experience in Kūfa, his Shi'i conviction is understandable. Al-Tusi (995–1067) is the only early source specifying the exact sect to which al-Isfahani belonged in the fluid Shi'i world: he was a Zaydī. Although al-Ṭūsī's view is widely accepted, its veracity is not beyond doubt. Al-Isfahani does not seem to have been informed of the latest Zaydī movements in Yemen and Ṭabaristān during his life, while his association with the Kūfan Zaydī community, which to some degree became less distinguishable from the Sunnīs, is yet to be studied in depth. It is clear, based on examination of how al-Isfahani amended the reports at his disposal, that he honoured Ali, who played a far more prominent role in his works than the first three caliphs, and some of his descendants, including Zaydi Shi'ism's eponym, Zayd ibn Ali (694–740), by presenting them positively, while, in some cases, leaving their enemies’ rectitude in question. In spite of that, al-Isfahani is neither keen to identify the imams in the past, nor discuss the qualities of an imam. (Note: The Zaydī writings in the late ninth and early tenth centuries more or less devote discussion to the role and qualities of imam; see, for example: al-Ḥādī ilā al-Ḥaqq also singled out a line of the Zaydi imams up till his time in his Kitab al-Ahkam; see:) As a matter of fact, he hardly uses the word, not even applying it to Zayd b. Ali. Furthermore, he does not unconditionally approve any Alid revolt and seems lukewarm towards the group he refers to as Zaydis. Taken together, al-Isfahani's Shi'i conviction is better characterised as moderate love for Ali without impugning the dignity of the caliphs before him.

== Legacy ==
Al-Isfahani authored a number of works, but only a few survive. Three of them are preserved through quotations: al-Qiyan ("The Singing Girls Enslaved by Men"), al-Diyarat ("The Monasteries"), and Mujarrad al-aghani (“The Abridgement of the Book of Songs”). A fragment of the Mujarrad al-aghani is found in Ibn Abi Uṣaybi'a's ʿUyun al-anba' fi tabaqat al-atibbaʾ, which quotes a poem by the caliph, al-Maʾmūn (r. 813–833), which was arranged as a song by Mutayyam. The first two have been reconstructed and published by al-ʿAtiyya, who collected and collateed the passages from later works that quote from al-Isfahani. The former, al-Qiyān, is a collection of the biographies of the enslaved singing girls. In it, al-Isfahani provided the basic information about the biographical subjects, the men who enslaved them, and their interaction with poets, notables such as caliphs, and their admirers, with illustration of their poetic and/or musical talents. The latter, al-Diyārāt, provides information related to monasteries, with the indication of their geographical locations and, sometimes, history and topographical characteristics. However, it is questionable to what extent the reconstructed editions can represent the original texts, since the passages, which quote al-Isfahani as a source for the given subject and are thus included by the editor, seldom identify the titles of the works.

Four works survive in manuscripts and have been edited and published: Maqātil al-Ṭālibīyīn ("The Ṭālibid Martyrs"), Kitab al-Aghani ("The Book of the Songs"), Adab al-ghuraba ("The Etiquettes of the Strangers"), and al-Ima al-shawair ("The Enslaved Women Who Composed Poetry"). As noted above, al-Isfahani's authorship of the Adab al-ghurabaʾ is disputed. (Note: See the section on Dates) The author, whoever he may have been, mentions in the preface his sufferings from the hardship of time and vicissitude of fate, and the solace which he seeks through the stories of bygone people. Hence, he collects in the Adab al-ghuraba the reports about the experiences of strangers; those away from their homes or their beloved ones. Some of the stories centre on the hardship which strangers, anonymous or not, encountered in their journey or exile, usually shown in the epigrams written on monuments, rocks, or walls. (Note: For an example, see:) Others relate excursions to the monasteries for drinking.

The al-Imāʾ al-shawāʿir was composed at the order of the vizier al-Muhallabī, al-Isfahani's patron, who demanded the collection of the reports about the enslaved women who composed poetry from the Umayyad to the Abbasid periods. Al-Isfahani confesses that he could not find any noteworthy poetess in the Umayyad period, because the people at that time were not impressed with verses featuring tenderness and softness. Thus, he only records the Abbasid poetesses, with mention of the relevant fine verses or the pleasant tales, and arranges them in chronological order. There are 31 sections, addressing 32 poetesses, most of which are short and usually begin with al-Isfahani's summary of the subject.

The Maqātil al-Ṭālibīyīn is a historical-biographical compilation concerning the descendants of Abu Talib, who died by being killed, poisoned to death in a treacherous way, on the run from the rulers’ persecution, or confined until death. The Maqātil literature was rather common, particularly amongst Shi'is, before al-Isfahani and he used many works of this genre as sources for the Maqātil al-Ṭālibīyīn. Al-Isfahani does not explain the motivation behind this compilation nor mention to whom they were dedicated, but according to the preface of this work, he sets out as a condition to recount the reports about the Ṭālibids who were “praiseworthy in their conduct and rightly guided in their belief (maḥmūd al-ṭarīqa wa-sadīd al-madhhab)”.

Like the al-Imāʾ, the work is structured in chronological order, beginning with the first Ṭālibī martyr, Jaʿfar b. Abī Ṭālib, and ends in the year of its compilation, August 925 (Jumādā I 313). For each biographical entry, al-Isfahani gives the full name, the lineage (sometimes adding the maternal side). Less often, he additionally gives the virtues and personal traits of the subject and other material he thinks noteworthy, for example the prophetic ḥadīth about, or transmitted by, the subject of the biography in question. Then, al-Isfahani gives the account of the death which, more often than not, constitutes the end of the entry. Sometimes poetry for or by the subject is attached. The Maqātil was used as a reliable source of information by many Shi'i and non-Shi'i compilers of the following centuries.

The Kitab al-Aghani, al-Isfahanis best known work, is an immense compilation, including songs provided with musical indications (melodic modes and meters of songs), the biographies of poets and musicians of different periods in addition to historical material. As noted above, al-Isfahani embarks on compiling the Aghani first under the command of a patron, whom he calls ra'is (chief), to reconstruct the list of one hundred fine songs, selected by Ishaq b. Ibrahim. (Note: See the section on Personalities, preferences and beliefs.) Due to an obscure report in Yaqut's Mu'jam, this raʾīs is often assumed to be Sayf al-Dawla al-Ḥamdānī (r. 945–967), (Note: The misconception that al-Isfahani gave his Aghani to Sayf al-Dawla came from a misreading of the text in Muʿjam al-udabāʾ; the original initially mentioned that Abu al-Qasim al-Husayn b. Ali al-Maghribi made an abridgement of the Aghani and gave it to Sayf al-Dawla Abu al-Hasan Sadaqa Fakhr al-Din b. Baha al-Dawla, whom Yaqut mistook for the Hamdanid, Sayf al-Dawla. This account is then followed by a comment from al-Ṣāḥib b. ʿAbbād and a dialogue between al-Muhallabī and al-Isfahani and then returns to the words of Abu al-Qasim, who states that he only made one copy of this work in his life and that that is the one given to Sayf al-Dawla. See also: Although Khalafallah admits that his reading is conjectural, he rightly points out the obscurities in this text.) but recent studies suggest that a more plausible candidate for the dedication of the Aghani is the vizier al-Muhallabī.

The Aghani is divided into three parts: first, The Hundred Songs (al-mi'a al-ṣawt al-mukhtara) and other song collections; second, the songs of the caliphs and of their children and grandchildren (aghani al-khulafa wa-awladihim wa-awlad awladihim); and third, al-Isfahanis selection of songs. The articles in each part are arranged based on different patterns, but it is mostly the song which introduces the articles on biographies or events. The Kitab al-Aghani is not the first book or collection of songs in Arabic, but it can be asserted that it is the most important one, for it "is a unique mine of information not only on hundreds of song texts with their modes and meters, but also on the lives of their poets and composers, and on the social context of music making in early Islam and at the courts of the caliphs in Damascus and Baghdad". Because of al-Isfahani's pedantic documentation of his sources, the Kitab al-Aghani can also be used to reconstruct earlier books of songs or biographical dictionaries on musicians that are otherwise lost.

As for the works that did not survive, based on their contents, as implied by their titles, they can be divided into the following categories:

The genealogical works: Nasab Bani Abd Shams ("The Genealogy of the Banu Abd Shams"), Jamharat al-nasab ("The Compendium of Genealogies"), Nasab Bani Shayban ("The Genealogy of the Banu Shayban"), and Nasab al-Mahaliba ("The Genealogy of the Muhallabids"), this last probably dedicated to his patron, the vizier al-Muhallabi.

The reports about specified or unspecified topics, such as Kitab al-Khammarin wa-l-khammarat ("The Book of Tavern-Keepers, Male and Female"), Akhbar al-tufayliyin ("Reports about Party Crashers"), al-Akhbar wa-l-nawadir ("The Reports and Rare Tales"), and Ayyam al-arab ("The Battle-Days of the Arabs"), which mentions 1700 days of the pre-Islamic tribal battles and was in circulation only in Andalusia. (Note: This and the Nasab Abd Shams seem to have been only available in the Iberian Peninsula; see:)

The reports about music, musicians and singers: the aforementioned Manajib al-khisyan ("The Noble Eunuchs"), Akhbzr Jahza al-Barmaki ("The Reports concerning Jahza al-Barmaki"), al-Mamalik al-shu'ara ("The Slave Poets"), Adab al-samz ("The Etiquettes of Listening to Music"), and Risala fi 'ilal al-nagham ("The Treatise on the Rules of Tones").

There are two works, only mentioned by al-Tusi: Kitab ma nazala min al-Qur'an fi amir al-mu'minīn wa-ahl baytih 'alayhim al-salam ("The Book about the Qur'anic Verses Revealed regarding the Commander of the Faithful and the People of His Family, Peace upon Them") and Kitab fihi kalam Fatima alayha al-salam fi Fadak ("The Book concerning the Statements of Fāṭima, Peace upon Her, regarding Fadak"). Should the attribution of these two works to al-Isfahani be correct, together with the Maqatil al-Talibiyin, they reveal al-Isfahani's Shi'i partisanship.

=== Works ===
Al-Isfahani is best known as the author of Kitab al-Aghani ("The Book of Songs"), an encyclopaedia of over 20 volumes and editions. However, he additionally wrote poetry, an anthology of verses on the monasteries of Mesopotamia and Egypt, and a genealogical work.

- Kitāb al-Aġānī (كتاب الأغاني) 'Book of Songs', a collection of Arabic chants rich in information on Arab and Persian poets, singers and other musicians from the 7th to the 10th centuries of major cities such as Mecca, Damascus, Isfahan, Rey, Baghdād and Baṣrah. The Book of Songs contains details of the ancient Arab tribes and courtly life of the Umayyads and provides a complete overview of the Arab civilization from the pre-Islamic Jahiliyya era, up to his own time. Abu ‘l-Faraj employs the classical Arabic genealogical device, or isnad, (chain of transmission), to relate the biographical accounts of the authors and composers. Although originally the poems were put to music, the musical signs are no longer legible. Abu ‘l-Faraj spent in total 50 years creating this work, which remains an important historical source.

The first printed edition, published in 1868, contained 20 volumes. In 1888 Rudolf Ernst Brünnow published a 21st volume being a collection of biographies not contained in the Bulāq edition, edited from manuscripts in the Royal Library of Munich.

- Maqātil aṭ-Ṭālibīyīn (مقاتل الطالبيين), Tālibid Fights, a collection of more than 200 biographies of the descendants of Abu Talib ibn Abd al-Muttalib, from the time of Muhammad to the writing of the book in 925/6, who died in an unnatural way. As Abul-Faraj said in the foreword to his work, he included only those Tālibids who rebelled against the government and were killed, slaughtered, executed or poisoned, lived underground, fled or died in captivity. The work is a major source for the Umayyad and Abbāsid Alid uprisings and the main source for the Hashimite meeting that took place after the assassination of the Umayyad Caliph al-Walīd II in the village of al-Abwā' between Mecca and Medina. At this meeting, al-'Abdallah made the Hashimites pledge an oath of allegiance to his son Muhammad al-Nafs al-Zakiyya as the new Mahdi.
- Kitāb al-Imā'āš-šawā'ir (كتاب الإماء الشواعر) 'The Book of the Poet-slaves', a collection of accounts of poetic slaves of the Abbasid period.

== See also ==
- List of Arab scientists and scholars
- List of Iranian scientists and scholars

== Works cited ==
- Amīn, Aḥmad (2009). Ẓuhr al-Islām (in Arabic). Cairo: Sharikat Nawābigh al-Fikr.
- ʿĀṣī, Ḥusayn (1993). Abū al-Faraj al-Iṣfahānī (in Arabic). Beirut: Dār al-Kutub al-ʿIlmiyya.
- al-Aṣmaʿī, Muḥammad ʿA. (1951). Abū al-Faraj al-Iṣbahānī wa-kitābuhu al-Aghānī: dirāsa wa-taḥlīl li-azhā al-ʿuṣūr al-islāmiyya (in Arabic). Cairo: Dār al-Maʿārif.
- Ibn al‑Athīr (1987). al-Daqqāq, Muḥammad Y. (ed.). al‑Kāmil fī al-tārīkh (in Arabic). Beirut: Dār al-Kutub al-ʿIlmiyya.
- Azarnoosh, Azartash (1992). "'Abū al-Faraj". In Madelung, Wilferd; Daftary, Farhad (eds.). Encyclopaedia Islamica (1st ed.). Leiden: Brill. doi:10.1163/1875-9831_isla_COM_0059. ISSN 1875-9823. OCLC 225873940.
- Bahramian, Ali (1992). "Maqātil al-Ṭālibīyīn". In Madelung, Wilferd; Daftary, Farhad (eds.). Encyclopaedia Islamica (1st ed.). Leiden: Brill. ISSN 1875-9823. OCLC 225873940.
- Bosworth, Clifford E. (2012). "al-Ṭabarī". In Bearman, Peri; Bianquis, Thierry; Bosworth, Clifford; van Donzel, Wolfhart; Heinrichs (eds.). Encyclopaedia of Islam (2nd ed.). Leiden: Brill. doi:10.1163/1573-3912_islam_COM_1133. ISSN 2214-9945. OCLC 846873166.
- Bosworth, Clifford E.; Marín, Manuela; Smith, G.R. (2012). "Ṭāhirids". In Bearman, Peri; Bianquis, Thierry; Bosworth, Clifford; van Donzel, Wolfhart; Heinrichs (eds.). Encyclopaedia of Islam (2nd ed.). Leiden: Brill. doi:10.1163/1573-3912_islam_COM_1152. ISSN 2214-9945. OCLC 846873166.
- Brown, Jonathan (2008). "Crossing Sectarian Boundaries in the 4th/10th Century: Ibn 'Uqda, a Man for All Seasons,'". Al-Usur Al-Wusta. 20 (2): 55–58.
- al-Isfahani, Abu’l Faraj (1888), Brünnow, Rudolf-Ernst (ed.), The Twenty-First Volume of Kitāb al-Aġānī; a Collection of Biographies not contained in the edition of Bulāq, Edited from Manuscripts in the Royal Library of Munich, Toronto: Lidin Matba' Bril
- Crone, Patricia (2005). Medieval Islamic Political Thought. Edinburgh: Edinburgh University Press.
- Crone, Patricia; Moreh, Shmuel (2000). "The Authorship of the Ghurabāʾ" in The Book of Stranger: Medieval Arabic Graffiti on the Theme of Nostalgia, by al-Iṣfahānī. Princeton: Markus Wiener Publishers.
- Abū Deeb, K. "Abū'l-Faraj Eṣfahānī". Encyclopaedia Iranica (online ed.).
- al-Dhahabī, Muḥammad b. Aḥmad (1995). Muʿawwaḍ, ʿAlī M.; ʿAbd al-Mawjūd, ʿĀdil A. (eds.). Mīzān al-iʿtidāl fī naqd al-rijāl (in Arabic). Beirut: Dār al-Kutub al-ʿIlmiyya.
- al-Dhahabī, Muḥammad b. Aḥmad (2004). ʿAbd al-Mannān, Ḥassān (ed.). Siyar aʿlām al-nubalāʾ (in Arabic). Beirut: Bayt al-Afkār al-Dawliyya. OCLC 962974446.
- van Ess, Josef (2017). Theology and Society in the Second and Third Centuries of the Hijra : a History of Religious Thought in Early Islam. Translated by O’Kane, John. Leiden: Brill. doi:10.1163/9789004323384. ISBN 978-90-04-32317-9. OCLC 962853051.
- Fleischhammer, Manfred (2004). Die Quellen des "Kitāb al-Aġānī" (in German). Harrassowitz Verlag. ISBN 978-3-447-05079-1. OCLC 57010704.
- Fleischhammer, Manfred (2012). "Munad̲j̲d̲j̲im". In Bearman, Peri; Bianquis, Thierry; Bosworth, Clifford; van Donzel, Wolfhart; Heinrichs (eds.). Encyclopaedia of Islam (2nd ed.). Leiden: Brill. doi:10.1163/1573-3912_islam_SIM_5501. ISSN 2214-9945. OCLC 846873166.
- Günther, Sebastian (1991). Quellenuntersuchungen zu den "Maqātil al-Ṭālibīyīn" des Abū-l-Farağ al-Iṣfahānī (gest. 356/967): Ein Beitrag zur Problematik der mündlichen und schriftlichen Überlieferung in der mittelalterlichen arabischen Literatur (in German). Hildesheim: Georg Olms Verlag. ISBN 978-3-487-09429-8. OCLC 27707486.
- Günther, Sebastian (1994). "Maqâtil Literature in Medieval Islam". Journal of Arabic Literature. 25 (3): 192–212. doi:10.1163/157006494x00103. ISSN 0085-2376.
- Günther, Sebastian (2007). "Abū al-Faraj al-Iṣfahānī". In Krämer, Gudrun; Matringe, Denis; Nawas, John; Rowson, Everett (eds.). Encyclopaedia of Islam (3rd ed.). Leiden: Brill. doi:10.1163/1573-3912_ei3_COM_0105. ISSN 1873-9830. OCLC 145927975.
- Haider, Najam (2008). "The Community Divided: A Textual Analysis of the Murders of Idrīs b. ʿAbd Allāh (d. 175/791)". Journal of the American Oriental Society. 128 (3): 459–475.
- Haider, Najam (2011). The Origin of the Shīʿa: Identity, Ritual, and Sacred Space in Eighth-Century Kūfa. Cambridge: Cambridge University Press. doi:10.1017/cbo9780511862618.002. ISBN 978-0-511-86261-8.
- al-Ḥamawī, Yāqūt (1922). Rifāʿī, Aḥmad F. (ed.). Muʿjam al-udabāʾ (in Arabic). Cairo: Maṭbūʿāt al-Maʾmūn. OCLC 15154883.
- Ibn Ḥajar al-ʿAsqalānī (2002). Abū Ghadda, ʿAbd al-Fattāḥ; Abū Ghadda, Sulaymān ʿA. (eds.). Lisān al-mīzān (in Arabic). Beirut: Maktabat al-Muṭbūʿāt al-Islāmiyya.
- Ibn Hazm, ʿAlī b. Aḥmad (1962). Hārūn, ʿAbd al-Salām M. ʿA. (ed.). Jamharat ansāb al-ʿarab (in Arabic) (5th ed.). Cairo: Dār al-Maʿārif. OCLC 652121877.
- Hoyland, Robert G (2006). "History, Fiction and Authorship in the First Centuries of Islam". In Bray, Julia (ed.). Writing and Representation in Medieval Islam: Muslim Horizons. London: Routledge.
- b. al-Ḥusayn al-Ḥādī ilā al-Ḥaqq, Yaḥyā (2001). al-Shādhilī, ʿAbdallāh M. (ed.). Majmūʿ Rasāʾil al-Imām al-Hādī ilā al-Ḥaqq al-Qawīm Yaḥyā b. al-Ḥusayn b. al-Qāsim b. Ibrāhīm (in Arabic). Ṣaʿda: Muʾassasat al-Imām Zayd b. ʿAlī al-Thaqāfiyya.
- Ibn al-ʿImād (1986). al-Arnāʾūṭ, ʿAbd al-Qādir; al-Arnāʾūṭ, Maḥmūd (eds.). Shadharāt al-dhahab fī akhbār man dhahaba (in Arabic). Beirut: Dār Ibn Kathīr.
- al-Iṣfahānī, Abū al-Faraj (1972). al-Munajjid, Ṣalāḥ al-Dīn (ed.). Adab al-ghurabāʾ (in Arabic) (2nd ed.). Beirut: Dār al-Kitāb al-Jadīd. OCLC 976619435.
- al-Iṣfahānī, Abū al-Faraj (1984). al-ʿAṭiyya, Jalīl (ed.). al-Imāʿ al-shawāʿir (in Arabic) (2nd ed.). Beirut: Dār al-Niḍāl. OCLC 957353410.
- al-Iṣfahānī, Abū al-Faraj (1989). al-ʿAṭiyya, Jalīl (ed.). al-Qiyān (in Arabic). London: Riad El-Rayyes.
- al-Iṣfahānī, Abū al-Faraj (1991). Ṣaqr, Aḥmad (ed.). Maqātil al-Ṭālibīyīn (in Arabic) (2nd ed.). Qom: Manshūrāt al-Sharīf al-Raḍī. OCLC 54095298.
- al-Iṣfahānī, Abū al-Faraj (1991). al-ʿAṭiyya, Jalīl (ed.). al-Diyārāt (in Arabic). London: Riad El-Rayyes.
- al-Iṣfahānī, Abū al-Faraj (2000). al-Baqāʿī, Yūsuf; al-Shaykh, Gharīd (eds.). Kitāb al-Aghānī (in Arabic) (2nd ed.). Beirut: Muʾassasat al-Aʿlamī.
- al-Iṣfahānī, Abū Nuʿaym (1990). Ḥasan, Sayyid Kasrawī (ed.). Akhbār Aṣbahān (in Arabic). Beirut: Dār al-Kitāb al-Islāmī. OCLC 903519445.
- Jabrī, Shafīq (1965). Abū al-Faraj al-Aṣbahānī (in Arabic). Cairo: Dār al-Maʿārif. OCLC 976576024.
- Khalafallāh, Muḥammad A. (1962). Ṣāḥib al-Aghānī: Abū al-Faraj al-Iṣfahānī al-Rāwiya (in Arabic) (2nd ed.). Cairo: Maktabat al-Anjalū al-Miṣriyya. OCLC 22143620.
- Ibn Khallikān, Aḥmad b. Muḥammad (1972). ʿAbbās, Iḥsān (ed.). Wafayāt al-aʿyān wa-anbāʾ abnāʾ al-zamān (in Arabic). Beirut: Dār Ṣādir.
- al-Khaṭīb al-Baghdādī (2001). Maʿrūf, Bashshār ʿA. (ed.). Tārīkh Madīnat al-Salām (in Arabic). Beirut: Dār al-Gharb al-Islāmī. OCLC 15747200.
- Kilpatrick, Hilary (2004). "On the Difficulty of Knowing Mediaeval Arabic Authors: The Case of Abū l-Faraj and Pseudo-Iṣfahānī". In Hoyland, Robert G. (ed.). Islamic Reflections, Arabic Musings. Studies in Honour of Professor Alan Jones from His Students. Oxford: Gibb Memorial Trust.
- Kilpatrick, Hilary (1978). "The Kitāb adab al-ghurabāʾ of Abū l-Farağ al-Iṣbahānī". La signification du bas Moyen Age dans l'histoire et la culture du monde musulman. Actes du 8me Congrès de l'Union Européenne des Arabisants et Islamisants Aix-en-Provence 1976 (in French). Aix-en-Provence: Édisud.
- Kilpatrick, Hilary (2003). Making the Great Book of Songs: Compilation and the Author's Craft in Abū l-Faraj al-Iṣbahānī's Kitāb al-Aghānī. London: Routledge. ISBN 978-0-7007-1701-9. OCLC 50810677.
- Leder, Stefan (2012). "al-Ṣūlī". In Bearman, Peri; Bianquis, Thierry; Bosworth, Clifford; van Donzel, Wolfhart; Heinrichs (eds.). Encyclopaedia of Islam (2nd ed.). Leiden: Brill. doi:10.1163/1573-3912_islam_SIM_7177. ISSN 2214-9945. OCLC 846873166.
- Madelung, Wilferd (1965). Der Imam al-Qāsim ibn Ibrāhīm und die Glaubenslehre der Zaiditen (in German). Berlin: Walter de Gruyter.
- al-Munajjid, Salāḥ al-Dīn (1972). al-Munajjid, Ṣalāḥ al-Dīn (ed.). Muqaddima of Kitāb adab al-ghurabāʾ, by Abū al-Faraj al-Iṣfahānī (in Arabic). Beirut: Dār al-Kitāb al-Jadīd.
- Ibn al-Nadīm (1988). Tajaddud, Riḍā (ed.). al-Fihrist (in Arabic). Tehran: Dār al-Masīra. OCLC 37734135.
- Nagel, Tilman (1970). "Ein früher Bericht über den Aufstand von Muḥammad b. ʿAbdallāh im Jahr 145 h". Der Islam (in German) (46 ed.).
- Nezhad, Golnoush S. M.; Dalfardi, Behnam; Ghanizadeh, Ahmad; Golzari, Samad E. J. (2015). "Insights into Avicenna's Knowledge of Gastrointestinal Medicine and His Account of An Enema Device". Acta medico-historica Adriatica. 13 (2): 29–40. ISSN 1334-4366.
- al-Rassī, al-Qāsim b. Ibrāhīm (2001). Jadabān, ʿAbd al-Karīm A. (ed.). Majmūʿ kutub wa-rasāʾil li-l-Imām al-Qāsim b. Ibrāhīm al-Rassī (in Arabic). Sana’a: Dār al-Ḥikma al-Yamāniyya.
- al-Qifṭī, ʿAlī b. Yūsuf (1986). Ibrāhīm, Muḥammad A. (ed.). Inbāh al-ruwāt ʿalā anbāh al-nuḥāt (in Arabic). Cairo: Dār al-Fikr al-ʿArabī.
- Rotter, Gernot (1977). Und der Kalif beschenkte ihn reichlich: Auszüge aus dem Buch der Lieder (in German). Tübingen: Horst Erdmann Verlag.
- Sallūm, Dāwūd (1969). Dirāsat Kitāb al-Aghānī wa-minhaj muʾallifihi (in Arabic). Baghdad: ʿĀlam al-Kutub. OCLC 20657313.
- Sawa, George D. (1989). Music Performance Practice in the Early Abbasid era 132–320 AH/750–932 AD. Toronto: Pontifical Institute of Mediaeval Studies. ISBN 0-88844-092-8. OCLC 18637666.
- Sawa, George D. (2002). "The Kitāb al-aghānī". In Danielson, Virginia; Marcus, Scott; Reynolds, Dwight (eds.). The Garland Encyclopedia of World Music. New York: Garland Publishing. ISBN 0-8240-6035-0. OCLC 36407898.
- Sellheim, Rudolf (2012). "al-Yazīdī". In Bearman, Peri; Bianquis, Thierry; Bosworth, Clifford; van Donzel, Wolfhart; Heinrichs (eds.). Encyclopaedia of Islam (2nd ed.). Leiden: Brill. doi:10.1163/1573-3912_islam_com_1365. ISSN 2214-9945. OCLC 846873166.
- Stern, S.M. (2012). "Abū Ḥayyān al-Tawḥīdī". In Bearman, Peri; Bianquis, Thierry; Bosworth, Clifford; van Donzel, Wolfhart; Heinrichs (eds.). Encyclopaedia of Islam (2nd ed.). Leiden: Brill. doi:10.1163/1573-3912_islam_sim_0202. ISSN 2214-9945. OCLC 846873166.
- Strothmann, Rudolf (1990). "Die Literatur der Zaiditen". Der Islam (in German). 1 (3–4): 354–368. doi:10.1515/islm.1910.1.3-4.354. ISSN 0021-1818. S2CID 202160694.
- Su, I-Wen (2016). The Shīʿī Past in Abū al-Faraj al-Iṣfahānī's Kitāb al-Aghānī: A Literary and Historical Analysis (Thesis). University of Edinburgh. hdl:1842/25958. Archived from the original on 2019-10-16.
- Su, I-Wen (2018a). "The Family History of Abū al-Faraj al-Iṣfahānī: the Ninth-Century ʿAbbasid Political Elite and the Ṭālibids in Samarra". Journal of Islamic Studies. 29 (3): 417–448. doi:10.1093/jis/ety001. ISSN 0955-2340.
- Su, I-Wen (2018b). "al-Iṣfahānī's Fandom in the Kitāb al-Aġānī (The Book of Songs): An Analysis of the Biography of Ibn Surayǧ". Jurnal Hadhari. 10 (2): 275–289. ISSN 1985-6830.
- al-Tanūkhī, Abū ʿAlī al-Muḥassin (1978). al-Shālijī, ʿAbbūd (ed.). al-Faraj baʿda al-shidda (in Arabic). Beirut: Dār Ṣādir. OCLC 12104833.
- al-Tanūkhī, Abū ʿAlī al-Muḥassin (1995). al-Shālijī, ʿAbbūd (ed.). Nishwār al-muḥāḍara wa-akhbār al-mudhākara (in Arabic) (2nd ed.). Beirut: Dār Ṣādir. OCLC 22693866.
- al-Tawḥīdī, Abū Ḥayyān (1992). al-Ṭanjī, Muḥammad T. (ed.). Akhlāq al‑wazīrayn (in Arabic). Beirut: Dār Ṣādir.
- al-Thaʿālibī (1983). Qamīḥa, Mufīd M. (ed.). Yatīmat al-dahr fī maḥāsin ahl al-ʿaṣr (in Arabic). Beirut: Dār al-Kutub al-ʿIlmiyya.
- al-Ṭūsī (1991). Ṣādiq, Muḥammad (ed.). al-Fihrist (in Arabic). Qom: Manshūrāt al-Sharīf al-Raḍī.
- Vadet, Jean-Claude (2012). "Ibn Ḥamdūn". In Bearman, Peri; Bianquis, Thierry; Bosworth, Clifford; van Donzel, Wolfhart; Heinrichs (eds.). Encyclopaedia of Islam (2nd ed.). Leiden: Brill. doi:10.1163/1573-3912_islam_SIM_3187. ISSN 2214-9945. OCLC 846873166.
- Zetterstéen, Karl V. (2012). "Muḥammad b. Ṭāhir". In Bearman, Peri; Bianquis, Thierry; Bosworth, Clifford; van Donzel, Wolfhart; Heinrichs (eds.). Encyclopaedia of Islam (2nd ed.). Leiden: Brill. doi:10.1163/1573-3912_islam_SIM_5367. ISSN 2214-9945. OCLC 846873166.
- al-Ziriklī, Khayr al-Dīn (2002). al-Aʿlām (in Arabic). Beirut: Dār al-ʿIlm li-l-Malāyīn.
