= Alfred von Domaszewski =

Austrian historian (1856–1927)

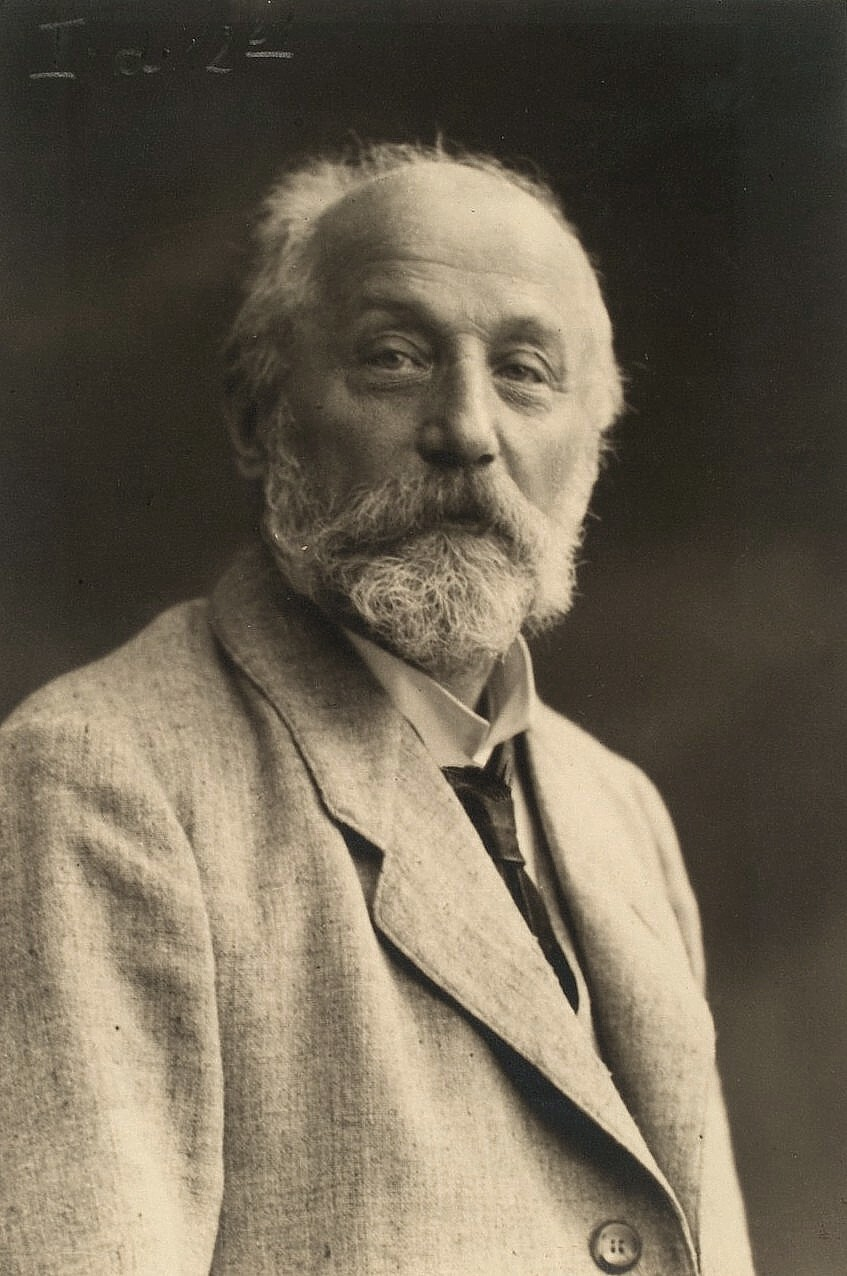

Alfred von Domaszewski (October 30, 1856 – March 25, 1927) was an Austrian historian.

== Biography ==
Born 30 October 1856 in Temesvár, Domaszewski received his education in Vienna, and following graduation remained in Vienna as a secondary school teacher. In 1884, he began work as an assistant at the Kunsthistorisches Museum in Vienna. In 1887, he became an associate professor of ancient history at the University of Heidelberg, where in 1890, he attained full professorship. One of his students was Ernst Kantorowicz.

In 1882, Domaszewski accompanied German archaeologist Carl Humann to Smyrna on behalf of the Berlin Academy of Sciences, with support from the Vienna Ministry of Education. He also assisted Humann on a reconstruction project involving the Monumentum Ancyranum. With philologist Rudolf Ernst Brünnow, he provided a comprehensive analysis and map of the ancient city of Petra.

== Selected publications ==
- Die Religion des römischen Heeres (The religion of the Roman Army), 1895.
- Die Rangordnung des römischen Heeres (The hierarchy of the Roman Army), 1907.
- Geschichte der römischen Kaiser (History of the Roman Emperor), 1909.
- Abhandlungen zur römischen Religion (Treatises on the Roman religion), 1909.
- Die Provincia Arabia 3 Vol. (with R. Brünnow), 1904-1909.
