= Walls of the Ruler =

Ancient Egyptian fortification

The Walls of the Ruler was a fortification, or possibly a whole string of them, built by Amenemhat I in the 14th nome of Lower Egypt to protect the eastern approaches to Egypt. It succeeded the Old Kingdom Walls of Sneferu.

The Walls of the Ruler are mentioned in the Tale of Sinuhe and in the Prophecy of Neferti. No remains have been found. New Kingdom depictions show forts which had a secured supply of water and were surrounded by crocodile-infested ditches or canals which were spanned by bridges.

== Cultural impact ==
Alfred J. Hoerth speculates that in the biblical tradition of the Exodus, Moses led the Israelites south to Pithom and Etham; had he led the people northwards toward the Promised Land, they would have most likely encountered the Walls of the Ruler. It would not have been possible for a large group of people to go undetected past these fortifications.

A fictionalized version of the Walls of the Ruler are present in the first DLC (The Hidden Ones) of the 2017 video game Assassin's Creed Origins. Unlike real-life accounts of it, it is located on the Sinai Peninsula, rather than mainland Egypt.
