= Rudolf Ernst Brünnow =

German-American orientalist and philologist (1858–1917)

Rudolph Ernst Brünnow
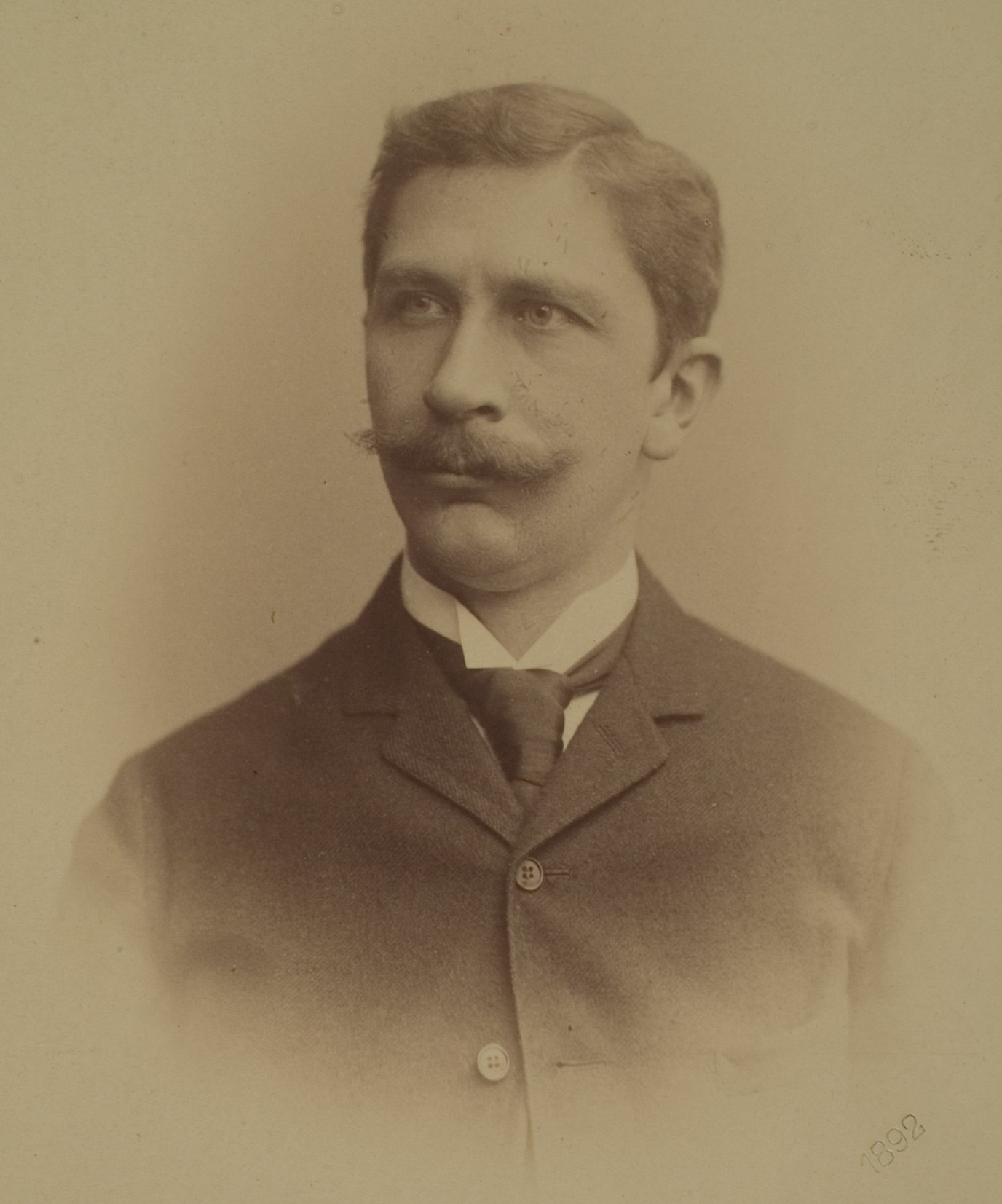
- Rudolph Ernst Brünnow (1892)
- Born: February 7, 1858; Ann Arbor, Michigan
- Died: April 14, 1917; Bar Harbor, Maine
- Education: University of Strasbourg
- Occupation: Orientalist
- Spouse: Marguerite Beckwith
- Children: Eric, Marguerite, Katherine, Richard, and Hildegard Brünnow
- Parent(s): Franz Friedrich Ernst Brünnow, Rebecca Lloyd Tappan Brünnow

Rudolph Ernst Brünnow (February 7, 1858, in Ann Arbor, Michigan – April 14, 1917, in Bar Harbor, Maine) was a German-American orientalist and philologist.

== Life ==
Letters (1897-1912)

The son of the Berlin-born astronomer Franz Friedrich Ernst Brünnow, Rudolph Ernst was born during the period his father was living in the United States. In 1863 the father and son returned to Europe. In 1882 he was awarded a doctorate in philosophy at the University of Strasbourg.

In 1897 and 1898, Brünnow and Alfred von Domaszewski, took two trips together to Arabia to gain new insights into the former Roman province Arabia Petraea. They surveyed the site at Petra and made the first modern map of this former capital of the Nabatean empire.

In 1909 Brünnow was the recipient of the Lucy Wharton Drexel Medal for his archeological work in Assyria and Arabia.

In 1910 Brünnow was appointed the chair of Semitic Languages at Princeton. In addition to the German and English languages he mastered French, ancient Greek, Latin, Turkish and Assyrian.

Brünnow was appointed as the Bar Harbor Village Improvement Association Path Committee Chairman in 1912, a position he remained at until his death in 1917. He is credited with designing the Precipice Trail, the Orange & Black Path, and the Beehive Trail at Acadia National Park.

== Works ==
- The Kharijites Among the First Omayyads (1884) online at archive.org
- A Classified List of all Simple and Compound Cuneiform Ideographs Occurring in the Texts Hitherto Published (I-III, 1887–88)
- The Provincia Arabia on the basis of the two trips undertaken in 1897 and 1898 and the Reports of earlier travellers described, 3 vols., Strasbourg 1904–1909 (together with Alfred von Domaszewski). online at archive.org
- 'Chrestomathy from Arabic Proscript Writers' (1895) online at archive.org
- Al-Juz 'al-hadi wa-al-'ishrun min Kitab al-Aghani by Abū l-Faraj al-Isfahānī, 897 or 8-967 (1888); Leiden Matba' Brill; Contributor Robarts – University of Toronto (Arabic) archive.org
