= Legio IV Martia =

Legio IV (or IIII) Martia was a legion of the Roman Empire, part of the Late Roman army. Its genesis is uncertain, but it probably existed in the time of Diocletian (r. 284-305), and certainly in the time of Notitia Dignitatum (390s). That document places the legion at Betthorus, modern El-Lejjun in Jordan, under the command of the Dux Arabiae. The place was in the civil jurisdiction of Palaestina Tertia.

The legion also had a fortress at Adhruh near Petra. It was removed when the defence of the area was assigned to the vassal state of the Ghassanids around 530.

== See also ==
- List of Roman legions
