= Betthorus =

Coordinates: 31.2379°N 35.8683°E

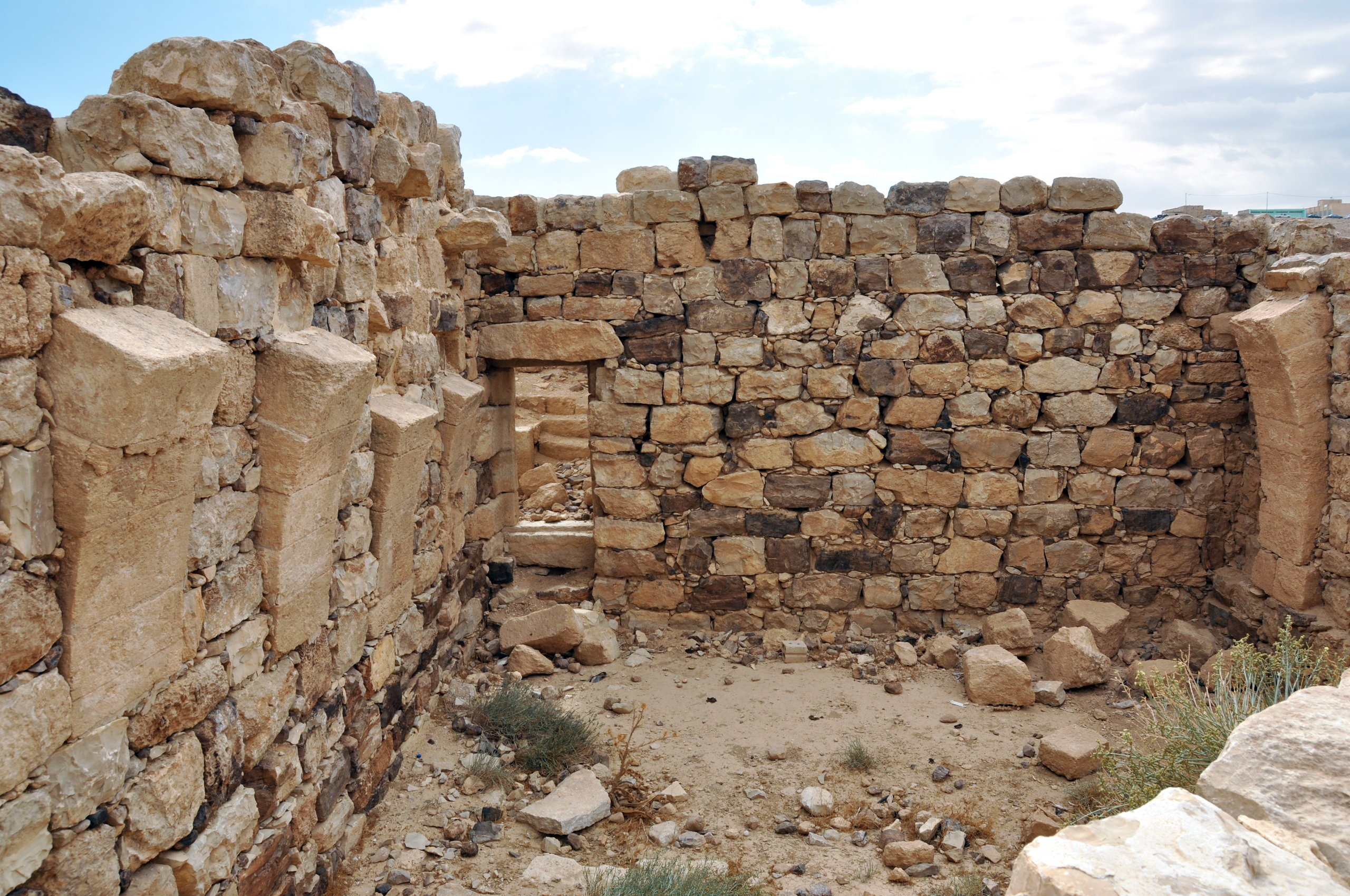
Part of Betthorus, 2009

Betthorus was a Roman legionary fortress on the Limes Arabicus. It is located in today's El-Lejjun (from Legio), Karak Governorate, Jordan, north-east of Al-Karak. The place is in proximity to the 'Ain-Lejjun spring, in a wadi of the same name, that flows into Wadi Mujib.

== Description ==
The rectangular fortress, measuring 190 metres (620 ft) by 242 metres (794 ft), covers 11.4 acres (46 dunams). The outer wall was 2.5 metres (8 ft 2 in) wide, had twenty flanking towers of semi-circular shape, four round corner towers, and a gate at each wall - major ones at north-east and north-west, and minor ones at the other two. A church is dated to 500. It was damaged by earthquakes in 363, 505, and 551.

== History ==
Legio IV Martia was stationed there in the 4th century. The troops were removed around 530, after the Ghassanids were charged with the defense of the border.

In the 1980s, S. Thomas Parker excavated the site.

== See also ==
- Castra/castrum, Roman army camp/fort
