= Via Traiana Nova =

Ancient Roman road built by Emperor Trajan

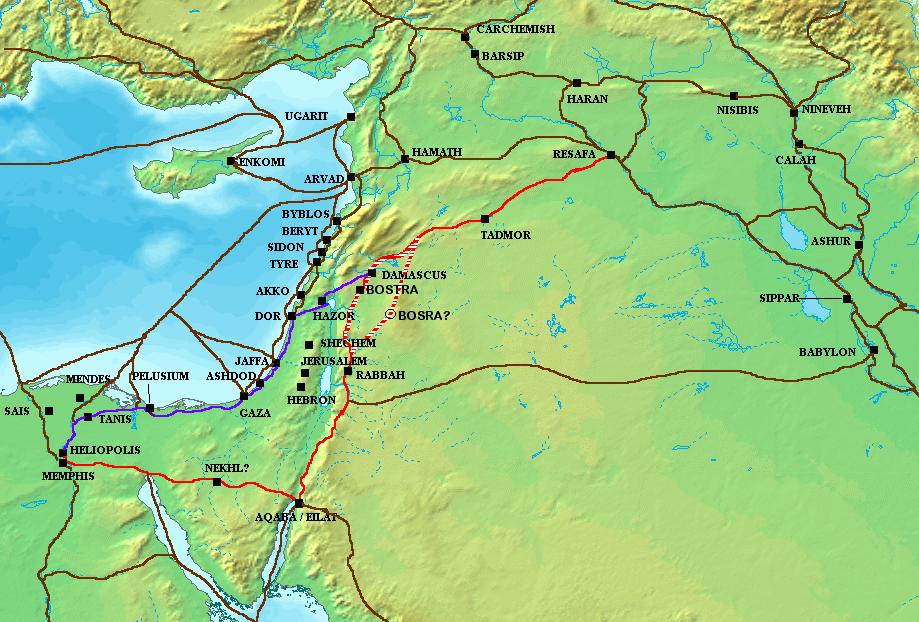
The Via Maris (purple), King's Highway (red), and other ancient Levantine trade routes, c. 1300 BCE.

The Via Traiana Nova or Via Nova Traiana (Latin for 'Trajan's New Road'), previously known as the Via Regia or King's Highway, was an ancient Roman road built by Emperor Trajan in the province of Arabia Petraea, from Aila (modern-day Aqaba) on the Red Sea to Bostra. It was specifically known as the Via Traiana Nova in order to distinguish it from the Via Traiana in Italy. It is occasionally also referred to simply as the Via Nova or 'Via Nova Traiana' Its construction started shortly after the annexation of Arabia, supervised by governor Gaius Claudius Severus, and was completed under Hadrian.

Some sections of the Via Nova Traiana are still visible in the natural landscape, especially in less developed areas where modern roads have not altered its course.
