= Raid of Sa'd ibn Zaid al-Ashhali =

Campaigns ordered by Muhammad

The Raid of Sa'd ibn Zaid al-Ashhali was an attack during the Early Muslim conquests during January 630 CE/Ramadan, 8 AH in the vicinity of al-Mushallal. Sa'd ibn Zaid al-Ashhali was sent to demolish the images of the gods worshipped by the Arabian polytheist tribes around the area.

== Raid to demolish al-Manat ==
A fictional representation of the Sword of Ali, the Zulfiqar. Two swords were captured from the temple of the Semitic Goddess Manāt. Muhammad gave them to Ali, saying that one of them was Al-Dhulfiqar, which became the famous sword of Ali and a symbol of Shia Islam.

In the same month as the mission of Khalid ibn al-Walid to destroy al-Uzza and the Suwa, Sa‘d bin Zaid Al-Ashhali was sent with 20 horsemen to Al-Mashallal to destroy an idol called Manāt, worshipped by the polytheist Al-Aws and Al-Khazraj tribes of Arabia. Here also a black woman appeared, naked with disheveled hair, wailing and beating on her chest. Sa‘d immediately killed her, destroyed the idol and broke the casket, returning at the conclusion of his errand.

The group who carried out this raid were formerly devoted worshippers of al-Manat. According to some sources, among them ibn Kalbi, Ali was sent to demolish al-Manat; however, Sir William Muir claims there is more evidence to suggest that the raid was carried out by Sa'd, and that it would have been out of character for Muhammad to send Ali, since Muhammad had been sending former worshippers to demolish idols.

Muir also mentions that, similarly to the aforementioned incident, during the Expedition of Khalid ibn al-Walid to Nakhla, an Ethiopian woman was killed, whom Muhammad claimed was the real al-Uzza. According to Muir, Muhammad said that the woman slain in this incident was the Goddess of the Al-Aws and Al-Khazraj tribes, i.e. Manat.

== Islamic Primary sources ==
The Muslim historian Hisham ibn al-Kalbi, mentions this event as follows:

The Quraysh as well as the rest of the Arabs continued to venerate Manah until the Apostle of God set out from Medina in the eighth year of the Hijrah[16], the year in which God accorded him the victory[17]. When he was at a distance of four or five nights from Medina, he dispatched 'Ali to destroy her. 'Ali demolished her, took away all her [treasures], and carried them back to the Prophet. Among the treasures which 'Ali carried away were two swords which had been presented to [Manah] by al-Harith ibn-abi-Shamir al-Ghassani, the king of Ghassan[18]. The one sword was called Mikhdham and the other Rasub. They are the two swords of al-Harith which 'Alqamah mentions in one of his poems.

He said:

"Wearing two coats of mail as well as Two studded swords, Mikhdham and Rasub [19]."

The Prophet gave these two swords to 'Ali.
[The Book of Idols, By Hisham Ibn-Al-Kalbi, Pg 13-14]

The event is also mentioned by Ibn Sa'd, in his book "Kitab al-tabaqat al-kabir, Volume 2". he mentions that the raid was carried out by Sa'd ibn Zaid al-Ashhali.

== See also ==
- Military career of Muhammad
- List of expeditions of Muhammad
