= Satanic Verses =

Retracted false revelation in Islamic tradition

The Satanic Verses are words of "Satanic suggestion", which the Islamic prophet Muhammad by some accounts mistook for divine revelation in an alleged incident. The first use of the expression in English is attributed to Sir William Muir in 1858. Whether the incident ever actually occurred is highly debated and many reject it as apocryphal.

According to early prophetic biographies of Muhammad by al-Waqidi, Ibn Sa'd and the tafsir of al-Tabari, Muhammad was manipulated by Satan (Iblis) to praise the three chief pagan Meccan goddesses – al-Lat, al-'Uzza, and Manat – while preaching Islam to an audience in Mecca. Religious authorities recorded the story for the first two centuries of the Islamic era. The words of praise for the pagan deities allegedly elicited by Satanic temptation are known as the Satanic Verses. A version of this episode, in which Muhammad does not issue the purported verses, takes place in surah 53 of the Quran.

Strong objections to the historicity of the Satanic Verses incident were raised as early as the 10th century. By the 13th century, most Islamic scholars (ulama) started to reject it as inconsistent with the theological principle of ismat al-anbiya (impeccability of the prophets); they also asserted that the isnads (chains of transmitters) of the accounts of the incident were inadequate according to the methodology of hadith criticism. According to some Islamic traditions, God sent Satan as a tempter to test the audience. Others categorically deny that this incident ever happened.

Some modern scholars of Islam accept the incident as historical, citing the implausibility of early Muslim biographers fabricating a story so unflattering to their prophet. Alford T. Welch considers this argument insufficient, but does not dismiss the possibility that the story has some historical basis. He proposes that the story may reflect a longer period of Muhammad's acceptance of the Meccan goddesses, known by his contemporaries and later condensed into a story that limits his acceptance of the Meccan goddesses' intercession to a single incident and assigns blame for this departure from strict monotheism to Satan. Carl W. Ernst writes that the existence of later insertions in early Meccan surahs indicates that the Quran was revised in dialogue with its first audience, who recited these surahs frequently in worship services and asked questions about difficult passages. A reading of surah 53 with this in mind leads Ernst to conclude that the Satanic Verses likely never existed as part of the Quran. He argues that the surah is heavily focused on the rejection of polytheism, which makes the inclusion of the verses unrealistic. Its absence from the canonical hadith collections supports his claim.

Others have suggested that the story may have been fabricated for theological reasons.

== Basic narrative ==
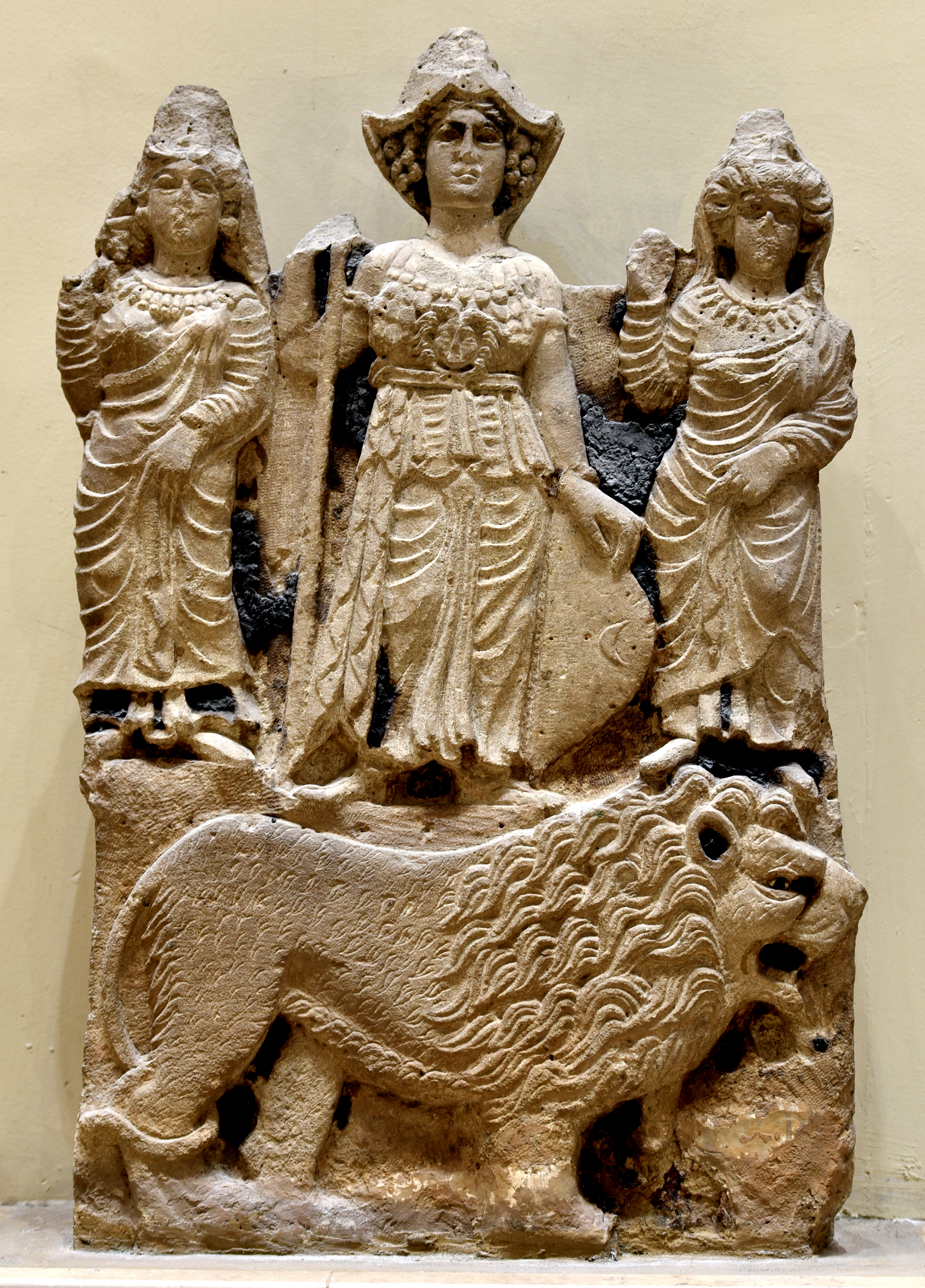
The Arabian goddess al-Lat, flanked by goddesses Manāt and al-'Uzzá

There are some accounts of the incident that differ in the construction and detail of the narrative, but they may be broadly collated to produce a basic account. The different versions of the story are recorded in early tafsirs (Quranic commentaries) and biographies of the Prophet, such as Ibn Ishaq's. In its essential form, the story reports that Muhammad longed to convert his kinsmen and neighbors of Mecca to Islam. It then reports that as he was reciting these verses of surah 53, considered a revelation from the angel Gabriel:

Have you thought of al-Lāt and al-'Uzzá? And about the third one, Manāt?^{[Quran 53:19–20]}

Satan tempted him to utter the following line which does not appear in the Quran:

These are the exalted gharāniq, whose intercession is hoped for.

Al-Lat, al-'Uzza, and Manat were three pre-Islamic Arabian goddesses worshipped by the Meccans. Discerning the precise meaning of the word gharāniq has proven difficult, as it has multiple appropriate meanings. Commentators have written that it means 'cranes'. In other contexts, the Arabic word does mean a crane – appearing in the singular as ghirnīq, ghurnūq, ghirnawq and ghurnayq, and the word has cousin forms in other words for birds, including 'raven', 'crow' and 'eagle'. Taken as a segment, "exalted gharāniq" has been translated by Orientalist William Muir to mean 'exalted women', while contemporary academic Muhammad Manazir Ahsan has translated the same segment as 'high-soaring ones (deities)'. Thus, whether the phrase had intended to attribute a divine nature to the three idols is a matter of dispute. In either case, scholars generally agree on the meaning of the second half of the verse, "whose intercession is hoped for".

== Tabari's account ==
An extensive account of the incident is found in al-Tabari's history, the Tarikh (Vol. VI, c. 915 CE):

The prophet was eager for the welfare of his people, desiring to win them to him by any means he could. It has been reported that he longed for a way to win them, and part of what he did to that end is what Ibn Humayd told me, from Salama, from Muhammad ibn Ishaq, from Yazīd ibn Ziyād al-Madanī, from Muhammad ibn Ka'b al-Qurazī:

When the prophet saw his people turning away from him, and was tormented by their distancing themselves from what he had brought to them from God, he longed in himself for something to come to him from God which would draw him close to them. With his love for his people and his eagerness for them, it would gladden him if some of the hard things he had found in dealing with them could be alleviated. He pondered this in himself, longed for it, and desired it.

Then God sent down the revelation. 'By the star when it sets! Your companion has not erred or gone astray, and does not speak from mere fancy...' [Q.53:1] When he reached God's words, "Have you seen al-Lāt and al-'Uzzā and Manāt, the third, the other?' [Q.53:19–20] Satan cast upon his tongue, because of what he had pondered in himself and longed to bring to his people, 'These are the high-flying cranes and their intercession is to be hoped for.'

When Quraysh heard that, they rejoiced. What he had said about their gods pleased and delighted them, and they gave ear to him. The Believers trusted in their prophet with respect to what he brought them from their Lord: they did not suspect any slip, delusion or error. When he came to the prostration and finished the chapter, he prostrated and the Muslims followed their prophet in it, having faith in what he brought them and obeying his command. Those mushrikūn of Quraysh and others who were in the mosque also prostrated on account of what they had heard him say about their gods. In the whole mosque there was no believer or kāfir who did not prostrate. Only al-Walīd bin al-Mughīra, who was an aged shaykh and could not make prostration, scooped up in his hand some of the soil from the valley of Mecca [and pressed it to his forehead]. Then everybody dispersed from the mosque.

Quraysh went out and were delighted by what they had heard of the way in which he spoke of their gods. They were saying, 'Muhammad has referred to our gods most favourably. In what he has recited he said that they are "high-flying cranes whose intercession is to be hoped for".'

Those followers of the Prophet who had emigrated to the land of Abyssinia heard about the affair of the prostration, and it was reported to them that Quraysh had accepted Islam. Some men among them decided to return while others remained behind.

Gabriel came to the Prophet and said, 'O Muhammad, what have you done! You have recited to the people something which I have not brought you from God, and you have spoken what He did not say to you.'

At that the Prophet was mightily saddened and greatly feared God. But God, of His mercy, sent him a revelation, comforting him and diminishing the magnitude of what had happened. God told him that there had never been a previous prophet or apostle who had longed just as Muhammad had longed, and desired just as Muhammad had desired, but that Satan had cast into his longing just as he had cast onto the tongue of Muhammad. But God abrogates what Satan has cast, and puts His verses in proper order. That is, 'you are just like other prophets and apostles.'

And God revealed: 'We never sent any apostle or prophet before you but that, when he longed, Satan cast into his longing. But God abrogates what Satan casts in, and then God puts His verses in proper order, for God is all-knowing and wise.' [Q.22:52]

So God drove out the sadness from His prophet and gave him security against what he feared. He abrogated what Satan had cast upon his tongue in referring to their gods: 'They are the high-flying cranes whose intercession is accepted [sic]'. [Replacing those words with] the words of God when Al-lāt, al-'Uzzā and Manāt the third, the other are mentioned: 'Should you have males and He females [as offspring]! That, indeed, would be an unfair division. They are only names which you and your fathers have given them' ... as far as 'As many as are the angels in heaven, their intercession shall be of no avail unless after God has permitted it to whom He pleases and accepts' [Q.53:21–26] meaning, how can the intercession of their gods be of any avail with Him? When there had come from God the words which abrogated what Satan had cast on to the tongue of His prophet, Quraysh said, 'Muhammad has gone back on what he said about the status of our gods relative to God, changed it and brought something else', for the two phrases which Satan had cast on to the tongue of the Prophet had found a place in the mouth of every polytheist. They, therefore, increased in their evil and in their oppression of everyone among them who had accepted Islam and followed the Prophet.

The band of the Prophet's followers who had left the land of Abyssinia on account of the report that the people of Mecca had accepted Islam when they prostrated together with the Prophet drew near. But when they approached Mecca they heard that the talk about the acceptance of Islam by the people of Mecca was wrong. Therefore, they only entered Mecca in secret or after having obtained a promise of protection.

Among those of them who came to Mecca at that time and remained there until emigrating to Medina and taking part in the battle of Badr alongside Muhammad there was, from the family of 'Abd Shams b. Abd Manāf b. Qussayy, 'Uthmān b. 'Affān together with his wife Ruqayya the daughter of the Prophet. Abū Hudhayfa b. 'Utba with his wife Shal bint Suhayl, and another group with them, numbering together 33 men.

== Reception in Muslim exegesis ==
=== Early Islam ===
Shahab Ahmed, author of a book on the Satanic Verses in early Islam, observed that in the era of early tafsirs and sirah (maghazi) literature, the incident was near-universally accepted by the early Muslim community and illustrative of a concept of prophethood involving an ongoing struggle. Later, it was rejected when the logic of the era of hadith collections and subsequent orthodoxy was based on two epistemological principles: the theological principle of 'iṣmat al-anbiyā (impeccability of the prophets) and the hadith methodological principle of assaying reports by their isnads.

Ibn Hazm considered the story to be fabricated, saying: "The hadith which includes the phrase, 'Indeed, they are the lofty Gharaniq, and their intercession is hoped for,' is an absolute lie. It is neither valid in terms of transmission nor worthy of being engaged with, as fabricating lies is within anyone's capacity."

According to Ibn Taymiyyah, there are two opinions in regard to this. It was transmitted that the early Islamic scholars (Salaf) believed the story, while later scholars (Khalaf) say that the transmission of the account is not established as reliable.

Ibn Kathir rejected the narration, saying: "The core of the story is from the authentic narration, but the Gharaniq story is disconnected and its chain of transmission is not authentic." This was a reference to the narration recorded by scholars such as Al-Bukhari and Al-Muslim who mentioned the recitation of the current verses of Chapter 53 and the prostration of the Muslims and the disbelievers upon their recitation, but not the intervention of Satan.

The earliest biography of Muhammad, Ibn Ishaq's (761–767) is lost but his collection of traditions survives mainly in two sources: Ibn Hisham (833) and al-Tabari (915). The story appears in al-Tabari, who includes Ibn Ishaq in the chain of transmission, but not in Ibn Hisham, where much that previous generations had recorded of the Prophet, he commented sternly, was either bogus, irrelevant, or sacrilegious. Ibn Sa'd and al-Waqidi, two other early biographers of Muhammad relate the story.

The doctrine of 'isma has been most forcefully and consistently upheld by the Shi'a, for whom it is a central tenet. It therefore appears that no Shi'ite of any school has ever accepted the Satanic Verses incident. Those Sunni scholars who did accept the incident had a slightly, but very significantly, different understanding of 'isma.

Paul Arno Eichler (1928) describes Muslims as believing that Satan's interference in divine revelation as a test sent by God. He explains this interpretation of Muslims by the fact that in Islamic thought, Satan himself is not the tempter, but merely the instrument through which God tests his subjects.

=== Later medieval period ===
Due to its controversial nature, the tradition of the Satanic Verses never made it into any of the canonical hadith compilations (though possible truncated versions of the incident did). The reference and exegesis about the Verses appear in early histories. In addition to appearing in Tabari's tafsir, it is used in the tafsirs of Muqatil, Abd al-Razzaq al-San'ani and Ibn Kathir, as well as the naskh of Abu Ja'far an-Nahhas, the asbab collection of Wahidi and even the late-medieval as-Suyuti's compilation al-Durr al-Manthūr fil-Tafsīr bil-Mathūr.

Objections to the incident were raised as early as the fourth Islamic century, such as in the work of an-Nahhās, and continued to be raised throughout later generations by scholars such as Abu Bakr ibn al-Arabi (d. 1157), Fakhr ad-Din al-Razi (1220) as well as al-Qurtubi (1285). The most comprehensive argument presented against the factuality of the incident came in Qadi Iyad's ash-Shifa'. The incident was discounted on two main bases. The first was that the incident contradicted the doctrine of 'isma, divine protection of Muhammad from mistakes. The second was that the descriptions of the chain of transmission extant since that period are not complete, nor sound nor authentic (sahih).

Al-Razi, commenting on Quran 22:52 in his Tafsir al-Kabir, stated that the "people of verification" declared the story as an outright fabrication, citing supporting arguments from the Quran, Sunnah and reason. He then reported that the preeminent Muhaddith, Ibn Khuzaymah, said "it is an invention of the heretics" when once asked about it. Al-Razi also recorded that al-Bayhaqi stated that the narration of the story was unreliable because its narrators were of questionable integrity.

Al-Shawkani stated that the story is not authentic, saying: "And nothing from this (Gharaniq story) is sahih, nor is it proven [except for] its lack of authenticity and falsehood as the scholars of verification have said for it contradicts the Book of Allah the Exalted". He then cites other scholars who also deemed it to be inauthentic, such al-Bazzar, al-Bayhaqi, and Ibn Khuzaymah.

Those scholars who acknowledged the historicity of the incident apparently had a different method for the assessment of reports than that which has become standard Islamic methodology. For example, Ibn Taymiyyah took the position that since tafsir and sirah-maghazi reports were commonly transmitted by incomplete isnads, these reports should not be assessed according to the completeness of the chains but rather on the basis of recurrent transmission of common meaning between reports.

Al-Qurtubi (al-Jāmi' li ahkām al-Qur'ān) dismisses all these variants in favor of the explanation that once surah 53 was safely revealed the basic events of the incident (or rumors of them) "were now permitted to occur to identify those of his followers who would accept Muhammad's explanation of the blasphemous imposture" (JSS 15, pp. 254–255).

Ibn Hajar al-Asqalani wrote:

All the chains of this narration are weak, except of Said Ibn Jubayr. And when one incident is reported from many different chains, then it means there is something real in this incident. Moreover, this incident has also been narrated through 2 Mursal (where chain goes up to Successor, i.e., Tabari) traditions, whose chains of narration are authentic according to the standards of Imam Bukhari and Imam Muslim. First one is what Tabari recorded from Younus bin Yazid, he from Ibn Shahab that Abu Bakr Ibn Abdul Rehman narrated me. While second one which Tabari recorded from Mutabar bin Sulayman and Hammad bin Salama, and they from Dawud bin Abi Hind, and he from Abu Aliya [...] Ibn Arabi and Qadhi Ayyad say there is no proof of this incident, but contrary to their claim when one incident comes through different chain of narrations, then it means that this incident is real. While there are not only multiple chain of narrations about this incident, but also 3 of them are authentic while 2 of them are Mursal narrations.

=== Modern Islamic scholarship ===
While the authors of the tafsir texts during the first two centuries of the Islamic era do not seem to have regarded the tradition as in any way inauspicious or unflattering to Muhammad, it seems to have been universally rejected by at least the 13th century, and most modern Muslims likewise see the tradition as problematic, in the sense that it is viewed as "profoundly heretical because, by allowing for the intercession of the three pagan female deities, they eroded the authority and omnipotence of Allah. But they also hold ... damaging implications in regard to the revelation as a whole, for Muhammad's revelation appears to have been based on his desire to soften the threat to the deities of the people." Acceptance of the story is often considered grounds for takfir (being declared an unbeliever). Different responses have developed concerning the account.

Many modern Muslim scholars have rejected the story. Arguments for rejection are found in Muhammad Abduh's article "Mas'alat al-gharānīq wa-tafsīr al-āyāt", Muhammad Husayn Haykal's Hayat Muhammad (1933), Sayyid Qutb's Fi Zilal al-Quran (1965), Abul Ala Maududi's Tafhim-ul-Quran (1972) and Muhammad Nasiruddin al-Albani's Nasb al-majānīq li-nasf al-gharānīq.

Haykal points out the many forms and versions of the story and their inconsistencies and argues that "the contextual flow of [surah 53] does not allow at all the inclusion of such verses as the story claims". Haykal quotes Muhammad Abduh who pointed out that the "Arabs have nowhere described their gods in such terms as 'al gharaniq'. Neither in their poetry nor in their speeches or traditions do we find their gods or goddesses described in such terms. Rather, the word 'al ghurnuq' or 'al gharniq' was the name of a black or white water bird, sometimes given figuratively to the handsome blond youth." Lastly, Haykal argues that the story is inconsistent with Muhammad's personal life and is completely against the spirit of the Islamic message.

Aqa Mahdi Puya has said that these fake verses were shouted out by the Meccans to make it appear that it was Muhammad who had spoken them; he writes:

Some pagans and hypocrites planned secretly to recite words praising idolatry alongside the recitation of the Holy Prophet, while he was praying, in such a way that the people would think as if they were recited by him. Once when the Holy Prophet was reciting verses 19 and 20 of Najm one of the pagans recited: Tilkal gharani-ul ula wa inna shafa-atahuma laturja ('These are the lofty (idols), verily their intercession is sought after'). As soon as this was recited the conspirators shouted in delight to make the people believe that it was the Holy Prophet who said these words. Here, the Quran is stating the general pattern the enemies of the messengers of Allah followed when they were positively convinced that the people were paying attention to the teachings of the messengers of Allah and sincerely believing in them. They would mix their false doctrines with the original teachings so as to make the divine message a bundle of contradictions. This kind of satanic insertions are referred to in thus verse, and it is supported by Ha Mim: 26. It is sheer blasphemy to say that satanic forces can influence the messengers of Allah.

== Historicity debate ==
Since William Muir, the historicity of this episode had been accepted by secular academics. Some Orientalists, however, argued against the historic authenticity of these verses on various grounds. Sean Anthony observes a trend of more recent scholarship towards rejecting the historicity of the story after a period in which scholars were more divided.

Orientalists, including the authors of the most widely-read biographies of Muhammad (Muir, D. S. Margoliouth, W. Montgomery Watt, Maxime Rodinson and F. E. Peters), have generally accepted the veracity of the story, arguing that it is implausible that Muslims could have fabricated a story so unflattering to their prophet. However, Shahab Ahmed writes, "The widespread acceptance of the incident by early Muslims suggests, however, that they did not view the incident as inauspicious and that they would presumably not have, on this basis at least, been adverse to inventing it." Alford T. Welch also considers this rationale alone to be insufficient but does not rule out the possibility of some historical foundation to the story. He proposes that the story may be yet another instance of historical telescoping, i.e., a circumstance that Muhammad's contemporaries knew to have lasted for a long period of time later became condensed into a story that limits his acceptance of the Meccan goddesses' intercession to a brief period of time and assigns blame for this departure from strict monotheism to Satan.

John Burton argued for its fictitiousness based upon a demonstration of its actual utility to certain elements of the Muslim community – namely, those legal exegetes seeking an "occasion of revelation" for eradicative modes of abrogation. Burton supports his theory by the fact that Tabari does not discuss the story in his exegesis of the verse Q.53:20, but rather in Q.22:52. Disagreeing with Burton, G.R. Hawting writes that the Satanic Verses incident would not serve to justify or exemplify a theory that God reveals something and later replaces it himself with another true revelation. Burton, in his rejection of the authenticity of the story, sided with Leone Caetani, who wrote that the story was to be rejected not only on the basis of isnad, but because "had these hadiths even a degree of historical basis, Muhammad's reported conduct on this occasion would have given the lie to the whole of his previous prophetic activity."

Maxime Rodinson finds that it may reasonably be accepted as true "because the makers of Muslim tradition would never have invented a story with such damaging implications for the revelation as a whole." He writes the following on the genesis of the verses: "Obviously Muhammad's unconscious had suggested to him a formula which provided a practical road to unanimity." Rodinson writes that this concession, however, diminished the threat of the Last Judgment by enabling the three goddesses to intercede for sinners and save them from eternal damnation. Further, it diminished Muhammad's own authority by giving the priests of al-'Uzza, Manat, and al-Lat the ability to pronounce oracles contradicting his message. Disparagement from Christians and Jews, who pointed out that he was reverting to his pagan beginnings, combined with opposition and indignation from his own followers influenced him to recant his revelation. However, in doing so he denounced the gods of Mecca as lesser spirits or mere names, cast off everything related to the traditional religion as the work of pagans and unbelievers, and consigned the Meccan's pious ancestors and relatives to Hell. This was the final break with the Quraysh.

Fred Halliday states that rather than having damaging implications, the story is a cautionary tale, the point of which is "not to malign God but to point up the frailty of human beings," and that even a prophet may be misled by Satan – though ultimately Satan is unsuccessful.

Since John Wansbrough's contributions to the field in the early 1970s, though, scholars have become much more attentive to the emergent nature of early Islam, and less willing to accept back-projected claims of continuity:

To those who see the tradition as constantly evolving and supplying answers to question that it itself has raised, the argument that there would be no reason to develop and transmit material which seems derogatory of the Prophet or of Islam is too simple. For one thing, ideas about what is derogatory may change over time. We know that the doctrine of the Prophet's infallibility and impeccability (the doctrine regarding his 'isma) emerged only slowly. For another, material which we now find in the biography of the Prophet originated in various circumstances to meet various needs and one has to understand why material exists before one can make a judgment about its basis in fact...

In Rubin's contribution to the debate, questions of historicity are completely eschewed in favor of an examination of internal textual dynamics and what they reveal about early medieval Islam. Rubin claims to have located the genesis of many prophetic traditions and that they show an early Muslim desire to prove to other scriptuaries "that Muhammad did indeed belong to the same exclusive predestined chain of prophets in whom the Jews and the Christians believed. He alleges that the Muslims had to establish the story of Muhammad's life on the same literary patterns as were used in the vitae of the other prophets". The incident of the Satanic Verses, according to him, conforms to the common theme of persecution followed by isolation of the prophet-figure.

As the story was adapted to include Quranic material (Q22:52–53, Q17:73–74), the idea of Satanic temptation was claimed to have been added, heightening its inherent drama as well as incorporating additional Biblical motifs (cf. the Temptation of Christ). Rubin gives his attention to the narratological exigencies which may have shaped early sīra material, as opposed to the more commonly considered ones of dogma, sect, and political/dynastic faction.

Rubin also claimed that the supposed temporary control taken by Satan over Muhammad made such traditions unacceptable to early hadith compilers, which he believed to be a unique case in which a group of traditions are rejected only after being subject to Quranic models, and as a direct result of this adjustment.

Building on Rubin's views, Anthony has proposed that an early tradition attributed to 'Urwa b. al-Zubayr about the mass conversion and prostration of the Meccans but which does not mention the Satanic Verses was at a later stage connected with Q.53:19–20, Q.22:52 and Q.17:73–74.

Some scholars believe there is evidence in the Quranic text of surah 53 itself relevant to the question of historicity. Nicolai Sinai argues that the conciliatory Satanic Verses would make no sense in the context of the scathing criticism in the subsequent verses, whether they were uttered before Q.53:21–22 or (if those replaced the Satanic Verses) Q.53:24–25. Patricia Crone makes a similar point but regarding the preceding verses, Q.53:19–20. She argues that "Have you seen al-Lat...?" should be taken as a hostile question about literally seeing the three deities, particularly since the preceding half of the surah repeatedly claims that Allah's servant saw the heavenly being, and noting also other verses where a similar question is asked (Q.35:40 and Q.46:4).

On the other hand, Tommaso Tesei builds on the common observation (also mentioned by Crone) that verses 23 and 26-32 of Q. 53 appear to be an interpolation of long verses into a surah of otherwise short verses. Tesei argues that those verses display stylistic incoherence as well as a theological tension with the rest of Q. 53, a surah which is consistent with evidence external to the Islamic tradition regarding pre-Islamic deities and star worship. Of relevance to the possibility of historical elements in the Satanic Verses story, Tesei notes that the interpolation (as he sees it) coincides exactly with the traditional account that an explanatory comment was inserted to rectify the identification of the pagan deities as divine intercessors.

Shahab Ahmed noted that the Quran is at pains to deny that the source of Muhammad's inspiration is a shaytan (Q.81:19–20, Q.81:25) because for his immediate audience, the sources for the two categories of inspired individuals in society, poets and soothsayers, were shaytans and jinn, respectively, whereas Muhammad was a prophet.

== Related traditions ==
Several related traditions exist, some adapted to Quranic material, some not. One version, appearing in Tabari's tafsir and attributed to 'Urwa b. al-Zubayr (d. 713), preserves the basic narrative but with no mention of Satanic temptation. Muhammad is persecuted by the Meccans after attacking their idols, during which time a group of Muslims seeks refuge in Abyssinia. After the cessation of this first round of persecution (fitna) they return home, but soon a second round begins. No compelling reason is provided for the caesura of persecution, though, unlike in the incident of the Satanic Verses, where it is the (temporary) fruit of Muhammad's accommodation to Meccan polytheism. Another version attributed to 'Urwa has only one round of fitna, which begins after Muhammad has converted the entire population of Mecca, so that the Muslims are too numerous to perform ritual prostration (sūjud) all together. This somewhat parallels the Muslims and mushrikun (idolater) prostrating themselves together after Muhammad's first, allegedly Satanically-infected recitation of surah 53, in which allegedly the efficacy of the three pagan goddesses is acknowledged.

The image of Muslims and pagans prostrating themselves together in prayer in turn links the story of the Satanic Verses to very abbreviated sūjud al-Qur'ān (i.e. prostration when reciting the Quran) traditions found in the authoritative mussanaf hadīth collections, including the Sunni canonical ones of Bukhāri and Tirmidhī. Rubin claims that apparently "the allusion to the participation of the mushrikūn emphasises how overwhelming and intense the effect of this [surah] was on those attending". The traditions actually state that all cognizant creatures took part in it, humans as well as jinns.

Rubin further argues that this is inherently illogical without the Satanic Verses in the recitation, given that in the accepted version of verses Q.53:19–23, the pagans' goddesses are attacked. The majority of traditions relating to prostration at the end of surah 53 solve this by either removing all mention of the mushrikun, or else transforming the attempt of an old Meccan to participate (who, instead of bowing to the ground, puts dirt to his forehead proclaiming "This is sufficient for me") into an act of mockery. Some traditions even describe his eventual comeuppance, saying he is later killed at the battle of Badr. Thus, according to Rubin, "the story of the single polytheist who raised a handful of dirt to his forehead ... [in an] attempt of an old disabled man to participate in Muhammad's sūjud ... in ... a sarcastic act of an enemy of Muhammad wishing to dishonor the Islamic prayer". And "traditions which originally related the dramatic story of temptation became a sterilized anecdote providing prophetic precedent for a ritual practice".

== See also ==
- Allah as a lunar deity – Fringe historical claim related to the origins of Islam
- Criticism of the Quran – Criticism of Islam's holy book
- Demolition of al-Lat – Campaigns ordered by Muhammad
- Demolition of al-Uzza – Muslim military expedition to Nakhla in January 630 AD
- Demolition of Manat – Campaigns ordered by Muhammad
- Sirat Rasul Allah – Study of the life of Muhammad
