= List of expeditions of Muhammad =

The list of expeditions of Muhammad includes the expeditions undertaken by the Muslim community during the lifetime of the Islamic prophet Muhammad.

Some sources use the word ghazwa and a related plural maghazi in a narrow technical sense to refer to the expeditions in which Muhammad took part, while using the word sariyya (pl. saraya) for those early Muslim expeditions where he was not personally present. Other sources use the terms ghazwa and maghazi generically to refer to both types of expeditions.

Early Islamic sources contain significant divergences in the chronology of expeditions. Unless noted otherwise, the dates given in this list are based on Muhammad at Medina by Montgomery Watt, who in turn follows the chronology proposed by Leone Caetani.

== List of expeditions ==
Type legend

expeditions in which Muhammad took
part (28)
expeditions in which Muhammad did
not take part (73)

No.	Name	Gregorian date (CE)	Hijri year (AH)
1	Expedition of Hamza ibn Abd al-Muttalib	March 623	1
2	Expedition of Ubaydah ibn al-Harith	April 623	1
3	Expedition of al-Kharrar	May 623	1
4(1)	Patrol of al-Abwa	August 623	1
5(2)	Patrol of Buwat	September 623	2
6(3)	First Expedition to Badr (Safwan)	September 623	2
7(4)	Patrol of Zul Al-Ushairah	December 623	2
8	Raid on Nakhla	January 624	2
9(5)	Battle of Badr	13 March 624	2
10(6)	Siege of Banu Qaynuqa	April 624	2
11(7)	Invasion of Sawiq	May/June 624	2
12(8)	Al Kudr Invasion	May 624	3
13	Killing of Ka'b ibn al-Ashraf	August/September 624	3
14(9)	Raid on Dhu Amarr	September 624	3
15(10)	Invasion of Buhran	October/November 624	3
16	Al-Qarada raid	November 624	3
17(11)	Battle of Uhud	23 March 625	3
18(12)	Battle of Hamra al-Asad	March 625	3
19	Expedition of Qatan	June 625	4
20	Expedition of Abdullah Ibn Unais	June 625	4
21	Expedition of Al Raji	July 625	4
22	Expedition of Bi'r Ma'una	July 625	4
23(13)	Invasion of Banu Nadir	August 625	4
24(14)	Expedition of Badr al-Maw'id	April 626	4
25(15)	Expedition of Dhat al-Riqa	June 626	5
26(16)	Expedition of Dumat al-Jandal	August/September 626	5
27	Expedition of al-Muraysi'	January 627	5
28(17)	Battle of the Trench	April 627	5
29(18)	Invasion of Banu Qurayza	May 627	5
30	Expedition of Muhammad ibn Maslamah	June 627	6
31(19)	Invasion of Banu Lahyan	July 627	6
32	Expedition of Dhu Qarad	August 627	6
33	Expedition of Ukasha bin Al-Mihsan	August/September 627	6
34	First Raid on Banu Thalabah	August/September 627	6
35	Second raid on Banu Thalabah	August/September 627	6
36	Expedition of Zaid ibn Haritha (Al-Jumum)	September 627	6
37	Expedition of Zaid ibn Haritha (Al-Is)	September/October 627	6
38	Third Raid on Banu Thalabah	October/November 627	6
39	Expedition of Zayd ibn Harithah (Hisma)	October/November 627	6
40	Expedition of Zayd ibn Harithah (Wadi al-Qura)	November/December 627	6
41	Expedition of 'Abd al-Rahman ibn 'Awf	December 627/January 628	6
42	Expedition of Ali ibn Abi Talib (Fadak)	December 627/January 628	6
43	Second Expedition of Wadi al-Qura	628	6
44	Expedition of Kurz bin Jabir Al-Fihri	January/February 628	6
45	Expedition of Abdullah ibn Rawaha	February/March 628	6
46(20)	Treaty of Hudaybiyyah	March 628	6
47(21)	Conquest of Fidak	May 628	7
48(22)	Battle of Khaybar	May/June 628	7
49(23)	Third Expedition of Wadi al Qura	May 628	7
50	Expedition of Umar ibn al-Khattab	December 628	7
51	Expedition of Abu Bakr As-Siddiq	December 628	7
52	Expedition of Bashir Ibn Sa’d al-Ansari (Fadak)	December 628	7
53	Expedition of Ghalib ibn Abdullah al-Laithi (Mayfah)	January 629	7
54	Expedition of Bashir Ibn Sa’d al-Ansari (Yemen)	February 628	7
55	Expedition of Ibn Abi al-Awja al-Sulami	April 629	7
56	Expedition of Ghalib ibn Abdullah al-Laithi (Fadak)	May 629	7
57	Expedition of Ghalib ibn Abdullah al-Laithi (Al-Kadid)	June 629	8
58	Expedition of Shuja ibn Wahb al-Asadi	June 629	8
59	Expedition of Ka’b ibn 'Umair al-Ghifari	July 629	8
60	Battle of Mu'tah	September 629	8
61	Expedition of Amr ibn al-As	October 629	8
62	Expedition of Abu Ubaidah ibn al Jarrah	October 629	8
63	Expedition of Abi Hadrad al-Aslami	629	8
64	Expedition of Abu Qatadah ibn Rab'i al-Ansari (Khadirah)	November 629	8
65	Expedition of Abu Qatadah ibn Rab'i al-Ansari (Batn Edam)	December 629	8
66(24)	Conquest of Mecca	January 630	8
67	Expedition of Khalid ibn al-Walid (Nakhla)	January 630	8
68	Raid of Amr ibn al-As	January 630	8
69	Raid of Sa'd ibn Zaid al-Ashhali	January 630	8
70	Expedition of Khalid ibn al-Walid (Banu Jadhimah)	January 630	8
71(25)	Battle of Hunayn	January 630	8
72	Expedition of At-Tufail ibn 'Amr Ad-Dausi	January 630	8
73(26)	Battle of Autas	630	8
74	Expedition of Abu Amir Al-Ashari	January 630	8
75	Expedition of Abu Musa Al-Ashari	January 630	8
76(27)	Siege of Ta'if	February 630	8
77	Expedition of Uyainah bin Hisn	April/May 630	9
78	Expedition of Qutbah ibn Amir	May/June 630	9
79	Expedition of Dahhak al-Kilabi	June/July 630	9
80	Expedition of Alqammah bin Mujazziz	July/August 630	9
81	Expedition of Ali ibn Abi Talib (Al-Fuls)	July/August 630	9
82	Expedition of Ukasha bin Al-Mihsan (Udhrah and Baliy)	630	9
83(28)	Expedition of Tabuk	October/December 630	9
84	Expedition of Khalid ibn al-Walid (Dumatul Jandal)	October 630	9
85	Expedition of Abu Sufyan ibn Harb	630	9
86	Demolition of Masjid al-Dirar	630	9
87	Expedition of Khalid ibn al-Walid (2nd Dumatul Jandal)	April 631	9
88	Expedition of Surad ibn Abdullah	April 631	9
89	Expedition of Khalid ibn al-Walid (Najran)	June/July 631	10
90	Expedition of Ali ibn Abi Talib (Mudhij)	December 631	10
91	Expedition of Ali ibn Abi Talib (Hamdan)	632	10
92	Demolition of Dhul Khalasa	April 632	10
93	Expedition of Usama bin Zayd (Mu'tah)	May 632	10

== See also ==
- Types of Islamic Jihad
- Islam and war
- Military career of Muhammad
