= Expedition of Ghalib ibn Abdullah al-Laithi =

Expedition of Ghalib ibn Abdullah al-Laithi may refer to a number of expeditions by Ghalib ibn Abdullah al-Laithi including

- Expedition of Ghalib ibn Abdullah al-Laithi (Mayfah), January 629 AD, 9th month 7AH
- Expedition of Ghalib ibn Abdullah al-Laithi (Al-Kadid), May 629 AD, 1st month of 8AH
- Expedition of Ghalib ibn Abdullah al-Laithi (Fadak), January 629 AD, 8AH
