= Expedition of Ukasha bin Al-Mihsan (Udhrah and Baliy) =

The Expedition of Ukasha bin Al-Mihsan, against the tribes of Udhrah and Baliy (also spelt Bali), took place in October 630 AD, 9 AH of the Islamic Calendar.

== Banu Udhrah ==
The Banu Udhrah tribe were from present day Iraq, a nomadic Arabian tribe. In the eve of Islam (during the era when Islam began to rise in Arabia), the tribe is reported to have been practising Christianity but the Muslim historian Tarikh al-Yaqubi mentions that some members of the tribe also worshipped an Idol called al-Shams. The Muslim historian Hisham Ibn Al-Kalbi, wrote about the tribe in detail.

The main tribes were the Banu Judham, Udha and Bahra', all of whom became Christians. Whereas the tribes of the Arabian peninsula (Hijaz), such as the Bali, converted to what B.R. Pridham of the University of Exeter describes as "an Arab Monotheistic movement emanating from Yathrib" i.e. Islam.

== Expedition ==
Since the Military campaign led by Khalid ibn Walid in the area, some of the Banu Udrah had converted to Islam, however some members of the tribe were disaffected. Ukasha bin Al-Mihsan marched to area where the tribes of 'Udhrah and Baliy inhabited, and reached some land of theirs that was called Al-Jinab, and led a raid against them. No further details are known.

The event is also mentioned by the Muslim Scholar Ibn Sa'd in his book "Kitab al-tabaqat al-kabir", as follows:

THE SARIYYAH OF 'UKKASHAH IBN MIHSAN AL- ASADI AGAINST AL-JINAB THE TERRITORY OF THE ' UDHRAH AND THE BALLI

Then (occurred) the sariyyah of 'Ukkasha Ibn Mihsan al-Asadi against al-Jinab, the territory of the 'Udhrah and Balli in the month of Rabi' al-Akhar of the ninth year, from the hijrah of the Apostle of Allah, may Allah bless him...

[Kitab al-tabaqat al-kabir, By Ibn Sa'd, Volume 2, Pg 203]

It is mentioned by the Muslim historian Ahmad ibn Yahya al-Baladhuri, that the Banu Udhrah was one of the first tribes of the Hijaz to pay Muhammad Sadaqah, having converted to Islam around the early periods of Muhammad, when Islam began to rise in Arabia. It is not known whether they converted after of before this expedition.

== See also ==
- Military career of Muhammad
- List of expeditions of Muhammad
