= Expedition of Uyainah bin Hisn =

Date	July 630 AD, 9 AH, 1st month, of the Islamic Calendar.
Location	Around Najd (Central Saudi Arabia)
Result	63 men, women and children captured

Commanders and leaders
Uyayna ibn Hisn	Unknown

Strength
50	Unknown

Casualties and losses
Unknown	63 captured (11 men, 22 women and 30 boys)

The Expedition of Uyainah bin Hisn, against the Banu Tamim tribe took place in July 630, 9AH, 1st month, of the Islamic Calendar.

Muhammad sent Uyainah bin Hisn to collect tax from the Banu Tamim, but one of the sub-tribes attacked Uyainah and forced him out of the territory even before he could ask for the tax. Muhammad then sent 50 fighters against them and captured their men, women and children. The prisoners were later released, after a delegation of the tribe came to Muhammad asking for forgiveness.

== Expedition ==
=== Muhammad's tax collectors forced out ===
The Banu Tamim were a tribe who fought alongside Muhammad and helped in the Battle of Hunayn and Conquest of Mecca. However, when Muhammad sent a delegation led by Uyainah bin Hisn to collect tax (or zakat, which he made obligatory), the Banu al-Anbar, a sub-tribe of the Banu Tamim, refused to pay it. Instead they attacked him and forced him out of the territory, even before he could ask for the tax.

=== Capturing of men, women and children ===
Uyainah bin Hisn came back and told the news to Muhammad, who then sent 50 Muslim fighters to enforce his orders and make an example of the offenders. Uyainah bin Hisn launched a surprise attack against them, captured more than 50 men, women and children and brought them back to Muhammad in Medina. Muhammad kept these men, women and children in confinement. 11 men, 22 women and 30 boys were captured.

=== Poetry contest ===
Then a delegation of the Banu Tamim rushed to Medina to ask for his forgiveness. Muhammad refused to talk to them, as he felt they were disturbing him. According to Tabari and Ibn Sa'd, when the delegation came, the women and children saw them and began to cry, which explained their urgency to reach Muhammad.

When they had the chance to talk, they reminded him of their comradeship in arms (in the Battle of Hunayn) and offered to recite some poems to Muhammad and contest against Muhammad's own poets.

The first person to stand up and contest in poetry (which was an Arab tradition at the time) from the Banu Tamim. Then Muhammad ordered Thabit ibn Qays to reply with his poetry. Thabit recited that Muhammad was a messenger from heaven, devoted to the Muhajir (refugees) and the faithful. He finished the poem by threatening the destruction that were against all those who refuse Islam.

=== Quran verse ===
After reciting the poems, the Banu Tamim delegation admitted that Muhammad's poets exceeded them in eloquence. Muhammad released the prisoners thereafter but told them not to be so rude to him in the future. Is also said in one of the Quran verses, which perhaps it was revealed to them:

O ye who believe! Raise not your voices above the voice of the Prophet, nor speak aloud to him in talk, as ye may speak aloud to one another, lest your deeds become vain and ye perceive not.^{[Quran 49:1]}

The famous Muslim jurist, Ibn Kathir, mentions in his Tafsir that Thabit ibn Qays believed he was among the dwellers of fire because he raised his voice against Muhammad. Muhammad comforted him by claiming he was among the dwellers of paradise. Qays was later killed in the Battle of Yamama.

According to the Muslim Scholar Hussain Haykal, all tribes that refused Muhammad's authority faced his overwhelming power. They were confronted with the choices of either (1) converting to Islam and paying the zakat, or if they refused to convert, (2) submitting to the Muslim political power and paying the kharaj, (3) Fight and be enslaved or massacred. Kharaj is usually synonymous with jizyah, a tax levied on non-Muslims for protection.

== See also ==
- Military career of Muhammad
- List of expeditions of Muhammad
