= Expedition of Qutbah ibn Amir =

Date	August 630 AD, 9 AH, second month, of the Islamic Calendar
Location	Khath’am region
Result	Large casualties on both sides; Camel, goats captured as war booty. Some women taken prisoners

Commanders and leaders
Qutbah ibn Amir	Unknown

Strength
20	Unknown

Casualties and losses
Many killed Many wounded	Many Killed Many Wounded

The Expedition of Qutbah ibn Amir, against the Khath'am tribe took place in August 630 AD, 9AH, 2nd month, of the Islamic Calendar.

== Expedition ==
In 9 AH, August 630 AD, Muhammad sent Qutbah ibn Amir to carry out a raid against the Khath'am tribe. Qutbah ibn Amir was accompanied by 20 men with 10 camels. Qutbah raided the inhabitants while they were asleep and killed many of them. A large number of people from both sides were killed.

They also captured a large number of camels and goats, as well as some women. All the war booty was brought back to Madinah.

According to Muslim sources, the inhabitants then regrouped and chased the Muslims, but because of flooding in the area, the Muslims managed to escape.

== Islamic sources ==
=== Primary sources ===
The event is also mentioned by Muslim Scholar Ibn Sa'd in his book "Kitab al-tabaqat al-kabir", as follows:

THE SARIYYAH OF QUTBAH IBN 'AMIR IBN HADlDAH AGAINST KHATH'AM IN THE REGION OF BlSHAH, NEAR TURABAH.

Then (occurred) the sariyyah of Qutbah Ibn 'Amir Ibn Hadidah against Khath'am. in the region of Bishah. near Turabah, in Safar of the ninth year from the Hijrah of the Apostle of Allah, may Allah bless him.

They (narrators) said: The Apostle of Allah, may Allah bless him, sent Qutbah Ibn 'Amir Ibn Hadidah, at the head of twenty men against the tribe of Khath'am, in the region of Tabalah. He ordered them to make a surprise attack. They set out with ten camels riding them alternately. They captured a man and acquired from him. He pretended to be dumb, but soon after he cried out to the tribe to warn them. They struck his neck. Then they waited till the men of the tribe went to sleep, and then they led a surprise attack against them. They fought a fierce action a number of men were wounded, on both the sides. Qutbah Ibn 'Amir killed whom he could. They drove camels, goats and women to al-Madinah. A flood came and separated them from him, but they could not find way out.

After the separation of al-Khums their shares consisted of four camels each and a camel was considered equal to ten goats. There were one hundred and fifty camels and three thousand goats.

[Kitab al-tabaqat al-kabir, By Ibn Sa'd, Volume 2, Pg 200-201]

=== Secondary sources ===
The Muslim scholar Ibn Qayyim Al-Jawziyya wrote about the event in his biography of Muhammad as follows:

This took place in Safar 9 AH. Ibn Sa’d said: they said: the Messenger of Allaah sent Qutbah ibn ‘Aamir with twenty men to a region of Khath’am at the end of Tibaalah, and he commanded him to launch a raid. They went out with ten camels, which they took turns riding. They captured a man and interrogated him, but he would not speak, then he started yelling, raising the alarm, so they killed him. They waited until the people had gone to sleep, then they launched their attack. There was intense fighting, resulting in many wounded on both sides. Qutbah ibn ‘Aamir killed whoever he killed, and they (the Muslims) took the cattle, women and sheep to Madeenah. It says in the story that the people regrouped and pursued them, then Allaah sent a great flood which came between them and the Muslims, so the Muslims drove the cattle, sheep and prisoners whilst they were looking on, but they could not cross the water until they had gone. [Zad al-Ma'ad, 3/514]

=== Hadith literature ===
This Expedition took place in the Khath’am region. Sunan Abu Dawood, 14:2639 mentions that Muhammad sent an expedition to Khath'am

== See also ==
- Military career of Muhammad
- List of expeditions of Muhammad
