= Expedition of Khalid ibn al-Walid =

Expedition of Khalid ibn al-Walid may refer to various expeditions by Khalid ibn al-Walid, including:

- Expedition of Khalid ibn al-Walid (Banu Jadhimah), January 630 AD, 9th month of 8AH
- Expedition of Khalid ibn al-Walid (Nakhla), January 630 AD, 9th month of 8AH
- Expedition of Khalid ibn al-Walid (Dumatul Jandal) March 631 AD, 11th month of 9AH
- Expedition of Khalid ibn al-Walid (2nd Dumatul Jandal), April 631 AD
- Expedition of Khalid ibn al-Walid (Najran), June 631 AD, 10AH

== See also ==
- Khalid ibn al-Walid
