= Expedition of Surad ibn Abdullah =

Massacre of Jurash
Date	June, 632, 10AH
Location	Jurash, Yemen
Result	Muslim Victory Massacre of Jurash and Khath'am tribes

Belligerents
First Islamic State	Defenders of Jurash, Khath'am

Commanders and leaders
Muhammad (Oversaw the expedition) Surad ibn Abdullah	Local Leaders

Expedition of Surad ibn Abdullah to attack the people of Jurash took place in 10 AH of the Islamic calendar, around Spring (632 AD in the Gregorian calendar).

== Background ==
In 10 AH of the Islamic calendar, 15–20 men from the Banu Azd, led by Surad ibn Abdullah, presented themselves to Muhammad to submit to Islam. Muhammad recognized Surad as the ruler of his clan, and ordered him to war against the Non-Muslim tribes in his neighborhood due to them not converting to Islam.

== Expedition ==
=== Initial attack ===
Surad ibn Abdullah then set out on his military expedition to Jurash in Yemen, and Muhammad provided him with an army of Muslim fighters to fulfil his task. At that time, Jurash was a closed city inhabited by Yemeni tribes. The Khath'am tribe sought refuge with the people of Jurash, when they heard of the Muslim marching to the area, they shut themselves inside the closed city and refused to open the doors.

Surad ibn Abdullah besieged the city of Jurash for 1 month, but with no success. But then he pretended to withdraw from the area into the hills, the enemy fell into the trap, and then in pitch battles he defeated the pursuing enemy, and Tabari mentions that he inflicted heavy casualties on them.

=== Citizens of Jurash killed ===
The people of Jurash sent 2 ambassadors to Muhammad for talks of reconciliation, they talked to Muhammad kindly by referring to him, as "The Messenger of God".

They then asked Muhammad what was currently happening at Jurash, he said that camels were being slaughtered, to which Abu Bakr or Uthman (which the 2 men were sat next to) said that what Muhammad meant was, that their people have been killed already i.e. slaughtered. Abu Bakr or Umar then said to the 2 men, that they should go to Muhammad, and ask him to pray to remove the affliction (pain and suffering). They did just that and returned to their city to find all their people were killed, all women, children, men and elders were slaughtered.

== See also ==
- Military career of Muhammad
- List of expeditions of Muhammad
