= Expedition of Ibn Abi al-Awja al-Sulami =

Expedition of Ibn Abi Al-Awja Al-Sulami
Date	February 628 AD, 10th Month 7 AH
Location	Najran and Turbah
Result	Unsuccessful operation, many Muslims killed

Commanders and leaders
Ibn Abi Al-Awja Al-Sulami (WIA)	Unknown

Strength
50	Entire tribe (unknown population)

Casualties and losses
Most Muslims killed (Ibn Awja wounded)	Most enemies killed (2 captured)

Expedition of Ibn Abi Al-Awja Al-Sulami to Banu Sulaym took place in April 629 AD, 12th Month 8AH-1st Month 9AH, of the Islamic Calendar.

== Expedition ==
During the summer, many expeditions took place, some of them ending disastrously. A month after Muhammad returned from the pilgrimage (1st Umrah), he dispatched Ibn Abi Al-Awja Al-Sulami a group of 50 Muslims fighters to Banu Sulaym, demanding their allegiance to Islam. Banu Sulaym were a sister tribe of Banu Hawazin and inhabited the area of Najran and Turbah.

When Ibn Abi Al-Awja arrived in the Banu Sulaym area, he called them to convert to Islam. When the tribe refused, fighting erupted. Banu Sulaym fought back, and showered the Muslims with arrows and killed many of them. Ibn Abi Al-Awja was wounded and escaped to Medina with great difficulty. However, a year later, the Banu Sulaym embraced Islam and sent an embassy to submit themselves, as Muhammad was increasing his power.

== See also ==
- Military career of Muhammad
- List of expeditions of Muhammad
