= Expedition of Umar ibn al-Khattab =

Date	July 628 CE, 3rd month 7 AH
Location	Turbah
Result	Enemy escapes

Commanders and leaders
Umar ibn al-Khattab	Unknown

Strength
30	Entire tribe (unknown population)

The Expedition of Umar ibn al-Khattab to Turbah took place in July 628 CE, or in the 3rd month of the year 7 of the Islamic calendar (AH).

The expedition was led by Umar ibn al-Khattab, at the order of the Islamic prophet Muhammad.

== Expedition to Turbah ==
After returning to Medina from the Campaign of Wadi al-Qura, Muhammad sent Umar ibn al-Khattab with 30 men, against a branch of the tribes of Hawazin at Turbah, a distance of 4 nights march from Medina. Turbah was on the way to Sana and Najjran. Umar's troop travelled by night and hid by day. By the time the Muslim army arrived at the habitation, Hawazin already got news of the impending Muslim attack and they fled for their lives, according to the Muslim scholar "Saifur Rahman al Mubarakpuri".

== See also ==
- Military career of Muhammad
- List of expeditions of Muhammad
- Muslim–Quraysh War
