= Raid of Amr ibn al-As =

Raid of Zeeme
Date	January 630 AD, 8 AH
Location	Ruhat
Result	Suwa idol worshipped by Banu Hudhail is demolished

Commanders and leaders
Amr ibn al-As	Unknown

The raid of Amr ibn al-As, to Ruhat, took place in January 630 AD, 8AH, 9th month, of the Islamic Calendar.

== Raid to demolish Suwa ==
In the same month the idol Al-Uzza was demolished by Khalid ibn al-Walid, ‘Amr bin Al-‘As was sent on an errand to destroy another idol, worshipped by Banu Hudhail, called Suwa‘. It used to stand at a distance of three kilometres from Makkah.

On a question posed by the door-keeper, ‘Amr said he had been ordered by Muhammad to knock down the idol. The man warned ‘Amr that he would not be able to do it. ‘Amr approached the idol and destroyed it, then he broke the casket beside it but found nothing. The man immediately embraced Islam.

== See also ==
- Military career of Muhammad
- List of expeditions of Muhammad
