= Expedition of Abu Bakr As-Siddiq =

| Date | July 628 AD, 3rd month 7 AH |
| Location | Nejd |
| Result | Successful operation, many killed and captured |

Commanders and leaders
| Abu Bakr | Unknown |

Strength
| Unknown (large platoon) | Entire tribe (unknown population) |

Casualties and losses
| Unknown | Many killed and taken prisoner (Sunan Abu Dawud) |

The expedition of Abu Bakr As-Siddiq to Nejd is supposed to have taken place in July 628 AD, third month 7AH, of the Islamic calendar.

Abu Bakr led a large platoon in Nejd on the order of Muhammad. Many were killed and taken as prisoner. The Sunni Hadith collection, Sunan Abu Dawud mentions the event, where Abu Bakr was the leader of the expedition:

The Apostle of Allah (peace be upon him) appointed AbuBakr our commander and we fought with some people who were polytheists, and we attacked them at night, killing them. Our war-cry that night was "put to death; put to death." Salamah said: I killed that night with my hand polytheists belonging to seven houses.

— Sunan Abu Dawood, 14:2632

== See also ==
- Military career of Muhammad
- List of expeditions of Muhammad
- Muslim–Quraysh War
