= Expedition of At-Tufail ibn 'Amr Ad-Dausi =

The expedition of At-Tufail ibn 'Amr Ad-Dausi, to Dhul-Kaffain to destroy the idol Yaguth took place in January 630 AD, 8AH, 9th month of the Islamic Calendar.

Tufail ibn 'Amr Ad-Dausi was ordered to demolish the idol worshipped by his tribe, and to acquire catapults and testudos from his tribe, to use in the Siege of Taif. .

Muhammad was finding it difficult to force the people of Taif out of their fortress. The Banu Daws, one of the tribes living in the south of Makkah, had a knowledge of how to use a catapult and testudo, so Muhammad dispatched Tufail ibn 'Amr Ad-Dausi to request their assistance to break the fortifications using a catapult.

Muhammad also commanded Tufail to destroy the idol Yaguth, worshipped by his tribe. When Tufail approached to destroy the idol, the men, women and children gathered and were troubled that the idol was going to be burnt. They were waiting to see if any evil would befall Tufail should he harm the idol. As he set fire to it, he proclaimed:

"O Dhu-l Kafayn, of your worshipers I certainly am not. Fire have I inserted into your heart."

Then according to Muslim sources, the whole tribe became Muslim. 400 men from his tribe then marched with him to help Muhammad. The catapult and tetsudo was brought by Tufail and then used in the Siege of Taif.

== See also ==
- Military career of Muhammad
- List of expeditions of Muhammad
