= Expedition of Kaʽb ibn ʽUmair al-Ghifari =

Expedition in 629 AD

Date	July 629 AD, 8 AH, 3rd month
Location	Dhat Atlah
Result	Failed operation, 14 Muslims killed

Commanders and leaders
Ka’b ibn 'Umair al-Ghifari	Unknown

Strength
15	Unknown

Casualties and losses
14 killed (1 wounded)	Unknown

An expedition by Kaʽb ibn ʽUmair al-Ghifari (كعب بن عمير الغفاري) to Dhat Atlah, took place in July 629 AD, 8AH, 3rd month, of the Islamic Calendar.

== Expedition ==
According to the Muslim Scholar Safiur Rahman Mubarakpuri, Muhammad received some information that the Banu Quda‘a (Tribe of Quda'a) had gathered a large number of men to attack the Muslim positions. So Muhammad despatched Ka’b ibn 'Umair al-Ghifari al-Ansari at the head of 15 men to deal with this situation to a location beyond Wadi al-Qura (part of Syria).

They encountered the warriors, and called them to accept Islam, but the polytheists refused and showered the Muslims with arrows killing all of them except one (who pretended to be dead) who was carried back home later seriously wounded to tell Mohammed what had happened.

Muhammad was upset by this and planned an expedition to avenge his followers. The plan was cancelled when Muhammad learnt that the enemy had deserted the place.

== See also ==
- Military career of Muhammad
- List of expeditions of Muhammad
