= Expedition of Abi Hadrad al-Aslami =

Military expedition ordered by Muhammad

Date	November 629 AD, 8 AH
Location	Al-Ghaba
Result	Rifa'a ibn Qays successfully assassinated; Much booty captured

Commanders and leaders
Abi Hadrad al-Aslami	Rifa'a ibn Qays X

Strength
2	Unknown

Casualties and losses
0	1 beheaded, four women captured by Muslims

Expedition of Abi Hadrad al-Aslami, took place in January 629 AD, 7AH, Shawwal (tenth month) of the Islamic Calendar. In this expedition, the chief of the Banu Jusham tribe Rifa'a ibn Qays was successfully assassinated.

== Assassination of Rifa'a ibn Qays ==
Rifa'ah bin Qays and some men from the Banu Jusham bin Mo'awiya camped in al-Ghābah. According to Ibn Hisham he reportedly wanted to gather the people of Qais and entice them into fighting the Muslims. Muhammad, on hearing these reports, despatched Abu Hadrad with two men.

They set out until they were near the camp of Rifa'ah and his men and gathered intelligence. In the night, Abu Hadrad killed Rifa'ah, and then he with his two companions went back to Muhammad. The Muslim scholar Saifur Rahman al Mubarakpuri also mentions that, Abu Hadrad, through a clever strategy, managed to rout the enemy and capture many of their cattle as booty.

According to Ibn Hisham. Abu Hardad shot Qais with an arrow in the heart, and then cut off his head and quickly escaped, Ibn Hisham writes:

"As he went he passed by me, and when he came in range I shot him in the heart with an arrow, and he died without uttering a word. I leapt upon him and cut off his head and ran in the direction of the camp shouting "Allah hu akbar"."
[Ibn Hisham, Pg 671]

In total 1 person was beheaded and 4 women were captured by Muslims.

== Islamic Primary sources ==
The Expedition is referenced by the Muslim scholar Ibn Sa'd in his book, Kitab al-tabaqat al-kabir, Volume 2 and by Ibn Hisham, in his biography of Muhammad. Ibn Hisham mentions the event as follows:

The Raid of Ibn Abu Hadrad al-Aslami on al-Ghaba to Kill Rifa'a b. Qays al-Jushami

(pg 671)A man of B. Jusham b. Mu'awiya called Rifa'a b. Qays or Qays b. Rifa'a came with a numerous clan of B. Jusham and encamped with them in al-Ghaba intending to gather Qays to fight the apostle, he being a man of high reputation among Jusham. The apostle summoned me and two other Muslims and told us to go to this man (T. and bring him to him or) bring news of him, and sent us an old thin she- camel. One of us mounted her, but she was so weak that she could not get up until...

Now they [B. Jusham] had a shepherd who had gone out with the animals and was so late in returning that they became alarmed on his behalf. Their chief this Rifa'a b. Qays got up and took his sword and hung it round his neck, saying that he would go on the track of the shepherd, for some harm must have befallen him; whereupon some of his company begged him not to go alone for they would protect him, but he insisted on going alone. As he went he passed by me, and when he came in range I shot him in the heart with an arrow, and he died without uttering a word. I leapt upon him and cut off his head and ran in the direction of the camp shouting "Allah hu akbar" and my two companions did likewise, and by God, shouting

(pg 672) out to one another they all fled at once with their wives and children and such of their property as they could lay hands on easily. We drove off a large number of camels and sheep and brought them to the apostle and I took Rifa'a's head to the apostle, who gave me thirteen of the camels to help me with the woman's dowry, and I consummated my marriage.

[Ibn Hisham, Sirat Rasul Allah, Pg 671-672]

== See also ==
- Military career of Muhammad
- List of expeditions of Muhammad
