= Manat (goddess) =

Pre-Islamic pagan goddess of Arabia

Manāt
- Goddess of fate, fortune, time, death, and destiny
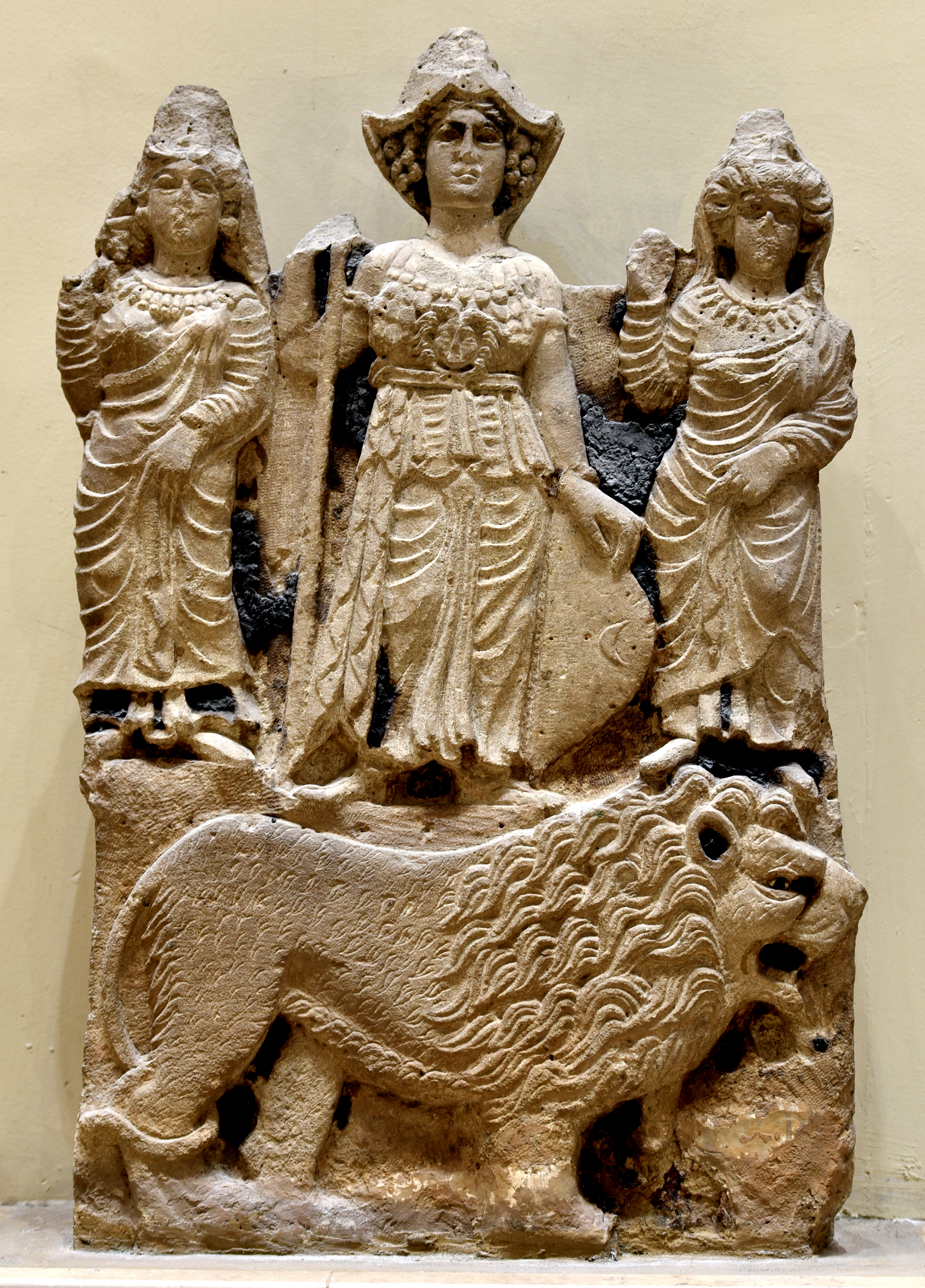
- 2nd century AD relief from Hatra depicting the goddess al-Lat flanked by two female figures, possibly al-Uzza and Manat
- Major cult center: Mecca
- Abode: Al-Mushallal
- Symbols: Waning moon, cup of death
- Region: Arabia

Genealogy
- Siblings: Al-Lat, Al-‘Uzzá
- Consort: Hubal

Equivalents
- Greek: Ananke

Manāt (Arabic: مناة, pronounced [maˈnaːh] (pausa) or [maˈnaːt], Old Arabic: [manaˈwat]; also transliterated as Manāh) was a pre-Islamic Arabian goddess worshipped in the Arabian Peninsula before the rise of Islam and the Islamic prophet Muhammad in the 6/7th century. She was among Mecca's three chief goddesses, alongside her sisters, Al-Lat and Al-‘Uzzá, and among them, she was the original and the oldest.

== Etymology ==
There are two possible meanings of the goddess' name. The first is that it was likely derived from the Arabic root "mana", thus her name would mean "to mete out", or alternatively "to determine", the second is that it derives from the Arabic word maniya meaning "fate". Both meanings are fitting for her role as goddess of fate and destinies. Pre-Islamic theophoric names including Manāt are well attested in Arab sources.

== Worship ==
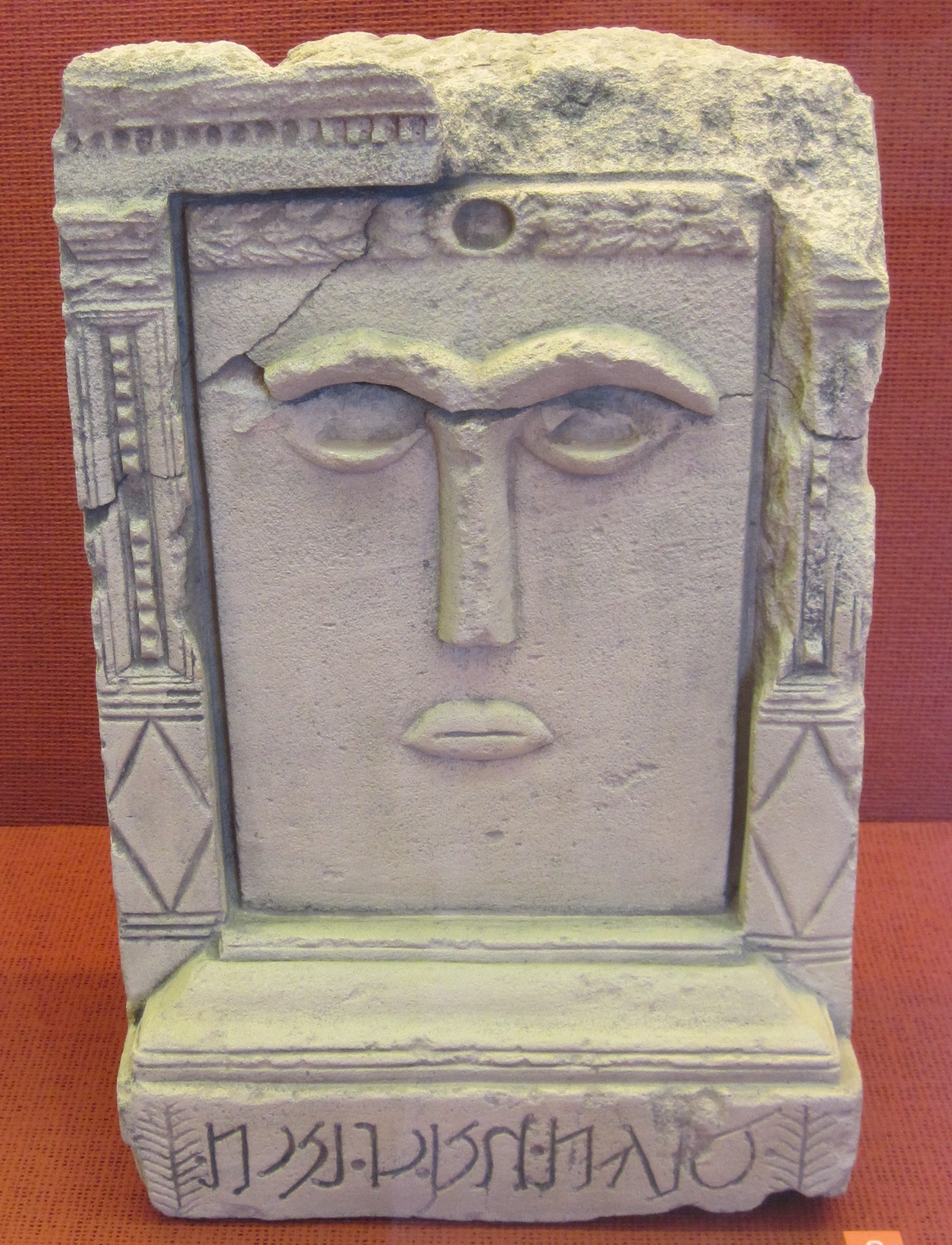
"Eye" image often associated with these goddesses

Considered a goddess of fate, fortune, time, and destiny, she was older than both Al-Lat and Al-‘Uzzá as theophoric names including hers, such as Abd-Manah or Zayd-Manah, are found earlier than names featuring Al-Lat's or Al-‘Uzzá's. But aside from being the most ancient of the three chief goddesses of Mecca, she was also very possibly among the most ancient of the Semitic pantheon as well. Hisham ibn-al-Kalbi also reports that she was the oldest of idols.

Her now-lost major shrine was between Mecca and Medina on the coasts of the Red Sea, likely in al-Mushallal where an idol of her was erected. The Banu Aws and Banu Khazraj were considered to be among the most devoted of tribes to the goddess, so much that the place to make sacrifices to her was commonly referred to by its significance to the Khazraj, as known from a poem most likely written by Abd-al-‘Uzza ibn-Wadi‘ah al-Muzani:

An oath, truthful and just, I swore By Manāh, at the sacred place of the Khazraj

Her early representations included a wooden portrait of her, which was covered with sacrificial blood, but the most notable representation of her was her idol erected in al-Mushallal. When pre-Islamic Arabians would pilgrim to al-Mushallal, they would shave their head and stand in front of Manāt's idol for a while. They would not consider their pilgrimage complete without visiting her idol.

An idol of her was also likely among the 360 idols in the Kaaba. According to Ibn al-Kalbi, when worshipers would circumambulate the Kaaba, they would chant her name along with that of her sisters, al-Lat and al-Uzza, seeking their blessings and intercession.

Manat was also thought to watch over graves, as indicated by a tomb inscription reading "And may Dushara and Manat and Qaysha curse anyone who sells this tomb or buys it or gives it in pledge or makes a gift of it or leases it or draws up for himself any document concerning it or buries in it anyone apart from the inscribed above".

== After the rise of Islam ==
=== Mention in the "Satanic" Verses ===
The different versions of the story are all traceable to one single narrator, Muhammad ibn Ka'b, who was two generations removed from biographer Ibn Ishaq. In its essential form, the story reports that Muhammad longed to convert his kinsmen and neighbors of Mecca to Islam. As he was reciting these verses of Sūrat an-Najm, considered a revelation from the angel Gabriel,

Have you thought of al-Lāt and al-‘Uzzá
and Manāt, the third, the other?
(Quran 53:19–20)

Satan tempted him to utter the following line:

These are the exalted gharāniq, whose intercession is hoped for. (In Arabic: تلك الغرانيق العلى وإن شفاعتهن لترتجى)

The line was taken from the religious chant of Meccan polytheists who prayed to the three goddesses while circumambulating the Ka'aba.

== Destruction of Temple ==
In the same month as the mission of Khalid ibn al-Walid to destroy al-Uzza and the Suwa, Sa‘d bin Zaid al-Ashhali was sent with 20 horsemen to Al-Mashallal to destroy an idol called Manāt, worshipped by the polytheist Al-Aws and Al-Khazraj tribes of Arabia. According to legend, a black woman appeared, naked with disheveled hair, wailing and beating on her chest. Sa‘d immediately killed her, destroyed the idol and broke the casket, returning at the conclusion of his errand.

The group who carried out this raid were formerly devoted worshippers of al-Manat. According to some sources, among them ibn Kalbi, Ali was sent to demolish al-Manat; however, Sir William Muir claims there is more evidence to suggest that the raid was carried out by Sa'd, and that it would have been out of character for Muhammad to send Ali, since Muhammad had been sending former worshippers to demolish idols.

=== Somnath temple ===
The attack on Somnath temple in India in 1024 by Mahmud of Ghazni may have been inspired by the belief that an idol of Manat had been secretly transferred to the temple. According to the Ghaznavid court poet Farrukhi Sistani, who claimed to have accompanied Mahmud on his raid, Somnat (as rendered in Persian) was a garbled version of su-manat referring to the goddess Manat. According to him as well as a later Ghaznavid historian Abu Sa'id Gardezi, the images of the other goddesses were destroyed in Arabia but the one of Manat was secretly sent away to Kathiawar (in modern Gujarat) for safe keeping. Since the idol of Manat was an aniconic image of black stone, it could have been easily confused with a lingam at Somnath. Mahmud is said to have broken the idol and taken away parts of it as loot and placed it on the ground so that people would walk on it. In his letters to the Caliphate, Mahmud exaggerated the size, wealth and religious significance of the Somnath temple, receiving grandiose titles from the Caliph in return.

== See also ==
- Selemene
