= Expedition of Khalid ibn al-Walid (Najran) =

Expedition of Khalid ibn al-Walid, to Najran, took place in 10AH of the Islamic Calendar, Around June 631 AD.

The event is mentioned partly in the Quran verse 3:61. The event is also mentioned by the Muslim jurist Tabari, who mentions that the prophet Muhammad wrote a letter to Khalid ibn al-Walid. Those letters are also mentioned by Muhammad Hamidullah in his French book Six Originaux des letters diplomatiques du Prophete e l'Islam, which contains a collection of six of the Muhammad's letters whose original texts have been preserved, that he compiled. Muhammad Hamidullah considered the letters authentic. The translator of Tabari, Volume 9, The last Years of the Prophet, Isma'il Qurban Husayn, mentions in the footnote on page 83, that the letter mentioned by Tabari is also in the texts collected by Muhammad Hamidullah.

== Background ==
Najran consisted of Christian tribes, and polytheist tribes. A year before this Expedition, the Christian portion of the Banu al-Harith sent a delegation led by a bishop. The Christian delegation started to debate with Muhammad, claiming that Jesus was the son of God. According to Ibn Kathir, the Quran verse 3:61 was "revealed" about this event:

But whoever disputes with you in this matter after what has come to you of knowledge, then say: Come let us call our sons and your sons and our women and your women and our near people and your near people, then let us be earnest in prayer, and pray for the curse of God on the liars. ^{[Quran 3:61]}

The delegation refused to convert to Islam, it is reported that one of Muhammad's companion said to the Christians:

If you have already decided that you will remain in your religion and your creed regarding your fellow (`Isa), then conduct a treaty with the man (Muhammad) and go back to your land.' [Quote referenced in Tafsir ibn Kathir]

According to Ar-Rahīq al-Makhtum (The Sealed Nectar), a modern Islamic hagiography of Muhammad written by the Indian Muslim author Saif ur-Rahman Mubarakpuri, having refused to convert to Islam, Muhammad ordered the tribe to pay the Jizyah and give Muhammad 2,000 garments, in exchange for peace and security. A part of the tribe were still practising Idolatry, and Muhammad only had a treaty with the Christian part of the tribe, so he sent Khalid ibn Walid with a group of armed men to call on the rest of the tribe to embrace Islam. Muhammad told Khalid to attack them if they refused to convert to Islam.

== Expedition ==
When Khalid arrived at the destination he sent armed men on horses on all directions to proclaim to the people:

Ye people! Embrace Islam, and ye Shall be safe. [Tabari Volume 9]

The remaining inhabitants agreed to convert, and Muhammad sent a despatch (official report), making it known that he was happy with the result.

It is mentioned by Tabari that Khalid ibn al-Walid, stayed with them to teach them Islam, then returned with a deputation of the tribe to Muhammad. Muhammad criticised the tribe for previously defending themselves against him when his followers attacked them, he said "You are the ones when driven away would push forward.", and then said that if they did not surrender when Khalid was sent to them, he would have cut their heads off, he said:

"Had Khalid b. al-Walid not written to me that you had surrendered and had not fought, I would have thrown your heads underneath your feet."[Tabari Volume 9]

Muhammad then engaged in an argument with them about how they defeated previous tribes which attacked them.

== Islamic primary sources ==
The event is partly mentioned in the Quran verse 3:61

The event is also mentioned by the Muslim Jurist Tabari, as follows:

The Messenger of God sent Khalid b. al-Walid in the month of Rabi' II, or Jumada I, in the year 10/631 to Banu al Harith b. Kab in Najran and ordered to invite them to Islam for three days before he fought them. If they should respond to him [with the acceptance of Islam], then he was to accept it from them, and to stay with them and teach them the Book of God, the sunnah of His prophet, and the requirements of Islam [ma'alim al-islam), if they should decline then he was to fight them.

Khalid departed and came to them, sending out riders in every direction inviting them to Islam and saying, "O people, accept Islam, and you will be safe." So they embraced Islam and responded to his call. Khalid stayed with them, teaching them Islam, the Book of God, and the sunnah of His prophet. Then Khalid wrote to the Messenger of God: "In the name of God, the Compassionate, the Merciful, to Muhammad the Prophet, the Messenger of God, from Khalid b. al-Walid. Peace be upon you, O Messenger of God, and God's mercy and blessings." The Messenger of God wrote to him:570 "In the name of God, the Compassionate, the Merciful, from Muhammad, the Prophet, the Messenger of God, to Khalid b. al-Walid. I praise God, the only God, unto you, the only God.

Now then: O Messenger of God, God bless you. You sent me to the Banu al-Harith b Ka'b and ordered that when i came to them, I should not fight them for three days and that I should Invite them to Islam. [You also ordered that] if they accepted it, I should accept it from them and teach then the requirements of Islam. The Book of God and the Sunnah of His Prophet. If they did not accept Islam, I was to fight them. I came to them and invited them to Islam for three days as the Messenger of God commanded me, and I sent riders among them riders among them [announcing], 'O Banu al-Harith, embrace Islam, and you will be safe.' They have surrendered and did not fight, and I am staying in their midst ordering them [to do] what God has ordered, forbidding them from [doing] what God has forbidden, and teaching them the requirements of Islam and Sunnah of the Prophet, until the Messenger of God writes to me. Peace be upon you, O Messenger of God, and God's mercy and blessings.

The Messenger of God wrote to him: "In the name of God the most compassionate the most merciful, from Muhammad, the Prophet, the Messenger of God, to Khalid b. al-Walid. Peace be upon you. I praise God, the only God, unto you. Now then: Your letter has reached me via a Messenger with news that the Banu al Harith [b. Ka'b] surrender before they fought and responded to your invitation of Islam and pronouncement (of the shahadah) that there is no God, except God alone, who has no associate and that Muhammad is His servant and His Messenger. God has guided them with His guidance, so give them good tidings and warn them and return, and let their deputation come with you. Peace be upon you, and God's mercy and His blessings." Then Khalid b. al-Walid came back to the Messenger of God and with him came the deputation of Banu al-Harith b. Ka'b. Qays b. al-Husayn b. Yazid b. Qanan Dhu al-Ghussah, Yazid b. 'Abd al-Madan, Yazid b. al-Muhajjal, 'Abdallah b. Qurayz, al- Ziyadi, Shadad b. Abdullah al-Qanani, and Amr b. Abdallah al-Dababi were among the delegation.

When they came to the Messenger of God, he saw them and asked who those people were, because they looked like Indians. He was told that they were the Banu al-Harith b. Ka'b. When they stood before the Messenger of God, they greeted him and said, "We testify that you are the Messenger of God and that there is no god but Allah." He replied, "And I testify that there is no god but Allah, and that I am the Messenger of God". Then he said "You are the ones when driven away would push forward." They then became silent and none of them answered him. He repeated it three times and none of them replied.

When he repeated it the fourth time Yazid b. 'Abd al-Madan replied, "Yes, O Messenger of God, we are the ones who, when driven away, pushed forward," and he repeated it four times. The Messenger of God said, "Had Khalid b. al-Walid not written to me that you had surrendered and had not fought, I would have thrown your heads underneath your feet."...

[Tabari, Volume 9, The last Years of the Prophet 82-84]

Tabari said Abdullah ibn Abi Bakr was the narrator of the event. The information of the letters mentioned by Tabari in the above has also been collected by Muhammad Hamidullah (and he considers his letters authentic). Muhammad Hamidullah collected 6 of Muhammad's letters whose original texts have been preserved, he compiled it in his French book Six Originaux des letters diplomatiques du Prophete e l'Islam. The translator of Tabari, The last Years of the Prophet, Isma'il Qurban Husayn, mentions in the footnote on page 83, that the letter mentioned by Tabari is also in the texts collected by Muhammad Hamidullah.

== See also ==
- Military career of Muhammad
- List of expeditions of Muhammad

== Notes ==
- Tabari, Al (25 Sep 1990), The last years of the Prophet, State University of New York Press, ISBN 978-0-88706-691-7
- Hamidullah, Muhammad. The life and work of the Prophet of Islam, Volume 1. s.n. p. 279. ISBN 978-969-8413-00-2. Original from: University of Michigan. Note: Author wrote:
  “Maybe more will be known one day on the story of this precious document, and who has preserved it throughout centuries. In the present state of our knowledge, the trace of the tearing, the trace of the seald, the very old aspect of the greatest part of the writing greatest part of the writing and the conformity of the text with what the classical authors have cited incline us to believe it, at least for the time being, as authentic”
  about the letters he collected, throughout his book, he has sections called “The Original of the Letter” or similar.
