= An-Najm =

53rd chapter of the Quran

Surah 53 of the Quran
النجم An-Najm The Star
- Qira'ah; English text
- Classification: Meccan
- Position: Juzʼ 27
- Hizb no.: 53
- No. of verses: 62
- No. of Rukus: 3
- No. of Sajdahs: 1 (verse 62)
- No. of words: 360
- No. of letters: 1433

An-Najm (Arabic: النجم, an-najm; meaning: The Star) is the 53rd chapter (surah) of the Quran, with 62 verses (āyāt). The surah opens with the oath of the Divine One swearing by every one of the stars, as they descend and disappear beneath the horizon, that Muhammad is indeed God's awaited Messenger. It takes its name from Ayat #1, which mentions "the stars" (najm). The surah confirms the divine source of the Prophet's message and refers to his ascension to heaven during the Night Journey (Ayah#1 ff.). The surah refutes the claims of the disbelievers about the goddesses and the angels (ayah#19 ff.), and lists several truths about God's power. It closes with a warning of the imminent Day of Judgement.

Regarding the timing and contextual background of the believed revelation (asbāb al-nuzūl), it is an earlier "Meccan surah", which means it is believed to have been revealed in Mecca, rather than later in Medina.

The surah is distinguished as being the first that required Muslims to prostrate, or perform sajdah, when it is recited, according to Tafsir Ibn Kathir and a number of hadiths. The surah claims that, when it was first narrated in Mecca, all Muslims and non-Muslims who heard the recitation (except one man) prostrated to God upon its completion due to the effect that the words had upon them.

== Summary ==
- 1-5 Oath that Muhammad received the Quran from the Angel Gabriel
- 6-18 Description of the angelic visions vouchsafed to Muhammad
- 19-20 21-23 The revelation concerning Al Lát, Al Uzzah, and Manáh etc.
- 24-31 The vanity of trusting to the intercession of female deities
- 32-33 God almighty and omniscient
- 34-55 Rebuke of a man who employed another to bear his punishment on the Judgment Day
- 56 Muhammad is a preacher like the prophets before him
- 57 ۩ 62 The Day of Judgement is drawing nearer and nearer, so prepare for it

== Exegesis ==
=== 1-18 legitimacy of Muhammad’s prophetic vision ===
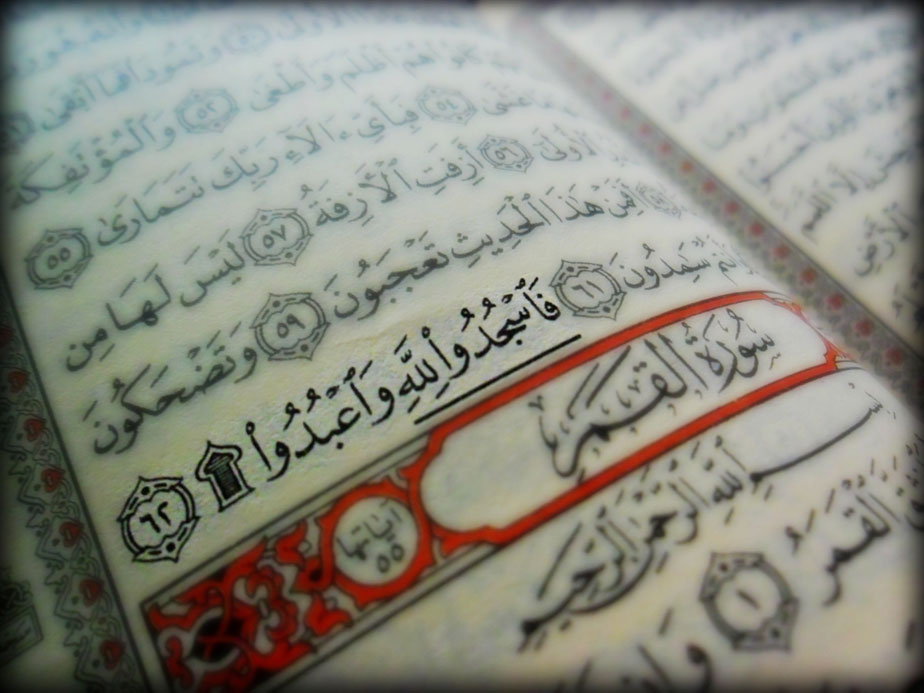
The last line of An-Najm: "So prostrate to Allah and worship [Him]."

The first eighteen verses of this surah are considered to be some of the earliest revelations of the Quran. These verses address the legitimacy of Muhammad's prophetic visions. The surah begins with the divine voice swearing by the collapsing star that "Your companion," referring to Muhammad, has not gone mad, nor does he speak out of his desire. The passage evokes the process of vision by tracing the movement along the highest horizon and then coming down and drawing near to the distance of "two bows" length. The passage ends with the affirmation of the validity of the vision by stating that the heart of the prophet "did not lie in what it saw."

=== 49 Surah ===
The surah is also known for referencing the star Sirius in verse 49, where it is given the name الشِّعْرَى (transliteration: aš-ši‘rā or ash-shira; the leader). The verse is: "وأنَّهُ هُوَ رَبُّ الشِّعْرَى", "That He is the Lord of Sirius (the Mighty Star)."

Ibn Kathir (d.1373) said in his commentary "that it is the bright star, named Mirzam Al-Jawza' (Sirius), which a group of Arabs used to worship." The alternate (to Sirius) Aschere, used by Johann Bayer, is derived from this.

=== Virtues ===
According to a narration from Imam Jafar Sadiq, "Whoever consistently recites Surah Najm every day or every night will have a good life among people, his sins will be forgiven, and he will be loved by others."

== See also ==
- Wa-an laysa lil-insani illa ma sa'a
