= Expedition of Ghalib ibn Abdullah al-Laithi (Mayfah) =

Date	January 629 AD, 9th Month 7 AH
Location	Mayfah
Result	Successful operation, captured a lot of camels and cattle as booty; Many polytheists killed

Commanders and leaders
Ghalib ibn Abdullah al-Laithi	Unknown

Strength
130	Entire tribe (unknown population)

Casualties and losses
0	Many Killed (unknown number)

Expedition of Ghalib ibn Abdullah al-Laithi to Mayfah took place in January 628 AD, 9th Month 7AH, of the Islamic Calendar.

== Expedition ==
Muhammad sent Ghalib ibn Abdullah al-Laithi as the commander of 130 men to Mayfah on the confines of Nejd, and was sent to launch an attack against Banu ‘Awâl and Banu Thalabah in Ramadan 7 A.H. The settlement was surprised and the Muslims put many to death, and drove off their camels and flock .

Usama, one of the fighters who went along, killed a man, after he had pronounced the testimony of God's Oneness at the last moment just before killing him (see Shahadah) to which incident Muhammad commented addressing his Companions: "Would you rip open his heart to discern whether he is truthful or a liar?"

This was the 4th surprise raid against the Banu Thalabah.

== Primary source ==
This event is mentioned in the following primary sources:

- Sahih al-Bukhari, 5:59:568
- Ibn Sa'd, Kitab al-tabaqat al-kabir, Volume 2
- Tabari, Volume 8, History of Islam

== See also ==
- Military career of Muhammad
- List of expeditions of Muhammad
