= Ghalib ibn Abd Allah al-Laythi =

Ghalib ibn Abd Allah al-Laythi (Arabic: غالب بن عبد الله الليثي) also known as Ghalib ibn Fadala al-Laythi (fl. 624–671), was an early companion and commander of the Islamic prophet Muhammad. During the prophet's lifetime, he led several expeditions against the polytheistic Bedouin tribes. He later participated in the conquest of Iraq in 634–636 and briefly as a commander in Khurasan in 668–671.

== Ancestry ==
Ghalib ibn Abd Allah belonged to the Kalb clan of the Arab tribe of Banu Layth, itself part of the tribe of Banu Bakr ibn Abd Manat, a subgroup of the Kinana.

== Military career ==
=== Expeditions under Muhammad ===
Ghalib became an early companion of the Islamic prophet Muhammad and commanded several military campaigns under his authority.

As early as 5 April 624, Muhammad dispatched Ghalib from Medina to lead a raid against the nomadic tribes of Ghatafan and Banu Sulaym. Three Muslims and a number of the tribesmen were slain, their livestock was captured and Ghalib returned to the city six days later. He later led a raid in al-Mayfa'a in the Najd (central Arabia), some distance from Medina, against the Banu Murra in January 629, during which a tribesman of the Juhaynah, allied with the Banu Murra, was killed. At another point in the year, Ghalib led an expedition of 130 men against the Banu Abd ibn Tha'laba clan, in which their camels and sheep were captured.

In either May 628 or May 629 he led a raid on the Banu al-Mulawwih at the village of al-Kadid. The tribe was taken by surprise. The Muslims killed a large number of the enemy soldiers and captured significant booty. The tribesmen then pursued the Muslims, but heavy floods hindered the pursuit, and the Muslims escaped to safety. Reasons given for the attack vary, the Banu Mulawwih may have provoked it or the reasons behind the attack are unknown.

=== Role in the conquest of Iraq ===
Although the historian Hisham ibn al-Kalbi (d. 819) notes that Ghalib died at the Fadak oasis during the lifetime of Muhammad, who died in 632, the historian Ibn Hajar al-Asqalani (d. 1449) claims this to be erroneous. During the caliphate of Umar (r. 634–644), Ghalib was dispatched at the head of a contingent of Kinana tribesmen to join the commander al-Muthanna ibn Haritha at the Battle of Buwayb in Iraq in November 634. He later participated in the Battle of Qadisiyya, including as a dueler, in November 636.

=== Commander in Khurasan ===
During the governorship of Ziyad ibn Abihi in Basra, the Muslim Arabs' garrison town in Iraq and the springboard for the conquest of the Sasanian Empire, Ghalib was appointed to replace the commander al-Hakam ibn Amr al-Ghifari in Khurasan in 668/69, following the death of al-Hakam. He was tasked with continuing al-Hakam's efforts to subdue the principalities of Tukharistan, which had rebelled against Arab authority. He was ultimately unsuccessful and replaced in 671 by Rabi ibn Ziyad al-Harithi.

== Bibliography ==
- Blankinship, Khalid Yahya, ed. (1993). The History of al-Ṭabarī, Volume XI: The Challenge to the Empires. SUNY Series in Near Eastern Studies. Albany, New York: State University of New York Press. ISBN 978-0-7914-0851-3.
- Donner, Fred M. (1981). The Early Islamic Conquests. Princeton: Princeton University Press. ISBN 0-691-05327-8.
- Fishbein, Michael, ed. (1997). The History of al-Ṭabarī, Volume VIII: The Victory of Islam: Muḥammad at Medina A.D. 626–630/A.H. 5–8. SUNY Series in Near Eastern Studies. Albany, New York: State University of New York Press. ISBN 978-0-7914-3149-8.
- Morony, Michael G., ed. (1987). The History of al-Ṭabarī, Volume XVIII: Between Civil Wars: The Caliphate of Muʿāwiyah, 661–680 A.D./A.H. 40–60. SUNY Series in Near Eastern Studies. Albany, New York: State University of New York Press. ISBN 978-0-87395-933-9.
- Shaban, M. A. (1979). The 'Abbāsid Revolution. Cambridge: Cambridge University Press. ISBN 0-521-29534-3.
- McDonald, M.V., ed. (1987). The History of al-Ṭabarī, Volume VII: The Foundation of the Community: Muḥammad at Madina, A.D. 622–626. SUNY Series in Near Eastern Studies. Albany, New York: State University of New York Press. ISBN 978-0-88706-344-2.
