= Expedition of al-Kharrar =

Date	623 CE (1 AH)
Location	Al Kharrar near Mecca modern day Saudi Arabia
Result	Quraysh Caravan escapes

Belligerents
Quraysh	Muslims

Commanders and leaders
Unknown	Sa'd ibn Abi al-Waqqas

Casualties and losses
None	None

The Expedition of al-Kharrar was one of the earliest sarriya which are, Raids that the prophet Muhammad hadn't personally participated in, as it was sent after the migration to Madina. It formed part of a strategy to monitor and intercept Qurayshi trade Caravans along the meccan route.

== The Expedition ==
Sa'd Ibn Abi al-Waqqas was dispatched to intercept the location of the Qurayshi trade Caravan, which was between Mecca and Madina.

The Force had attempted to intercept The Caravan, but it had arrived after it had Passed so no engagement had taken place and the Expeditionist group had gone back to Madina without fighting.

== Aftermath ==
Although the Expedition had failed to intercept the Caravan, it demonstrated the Ability of the Muslim Forces to operate between key trade routes and formed part of the developing Economic strategy against Quraysh.
