= Invasion of Sawiq =

Event in early islamic history, 624 CE

- Part of the Muslim–Quraysh War
| Date | (c. June 624), AH 2, Dhu al-Hijjah Islamic Calendar |
| Location | Madinah |
| Result | Quraysh victory (controversial): Abu Sufyan burns farms of Urayd and kills two Muslims, then flees; Muslims return bringing back some sawiq, a type of flour |

Belligerents
| Muslims | Quraysh |

Commanders and leaders
| Muhammad | Abu Sufyan |

Strength
| Unknown | 200 |

Casualties and losses
| 2 Muslim civilians killed | 0 |

The Invasion of Sawiq occurred after the Quraysh's defeat in the Battle of Badr. After suffering defeat at the Battle of Badr, Abu Sufyan ibn Harb, the Quraysh leader, vowed that he would not bathe until he avenged the results of that battle. Abu Sufyan gathered 200 mounted men, took the eastern road through the Nejd and secretly arrived by night, at the settlement of Banu Nadir, a Jewish tribe. However, the Jewish chief, Huwey refused him admission to the Jewish quarters (reportedly out of fear). Abu Sufyan along with another leader of the Banu Nadir tribe of Jews, Sallam ibn Mishkam, conspired to attack Madinah but they were unsuccessful. Abu Sufyan took refuge with Sallam bin Mishkan. Salam gave Abu Sufyan a hospitable welcome and the intelligence regarding Medina. At night, Abu Sufyan took his men to the Urayd corn fields, a place about two or three miles to the north-east of Medina. He burnt these farms and killed two Muslims. Abu Sufyan and his men ran away. When Muhammad found out, he gathered his men in hot pursuit. Abu Sufyan and his men, however, managed to flee. The Muslims managed to capture some of the sawiq (a type of flour) thrown away by the Quraysh men, who did so to lighten their burden and flee.

== See also ==
- List of expeditions of Muhammad
