= Al-Uzza =

Pre-Islamic Arabian goddess

al-‘Uzzá
- Goddess of might and protection
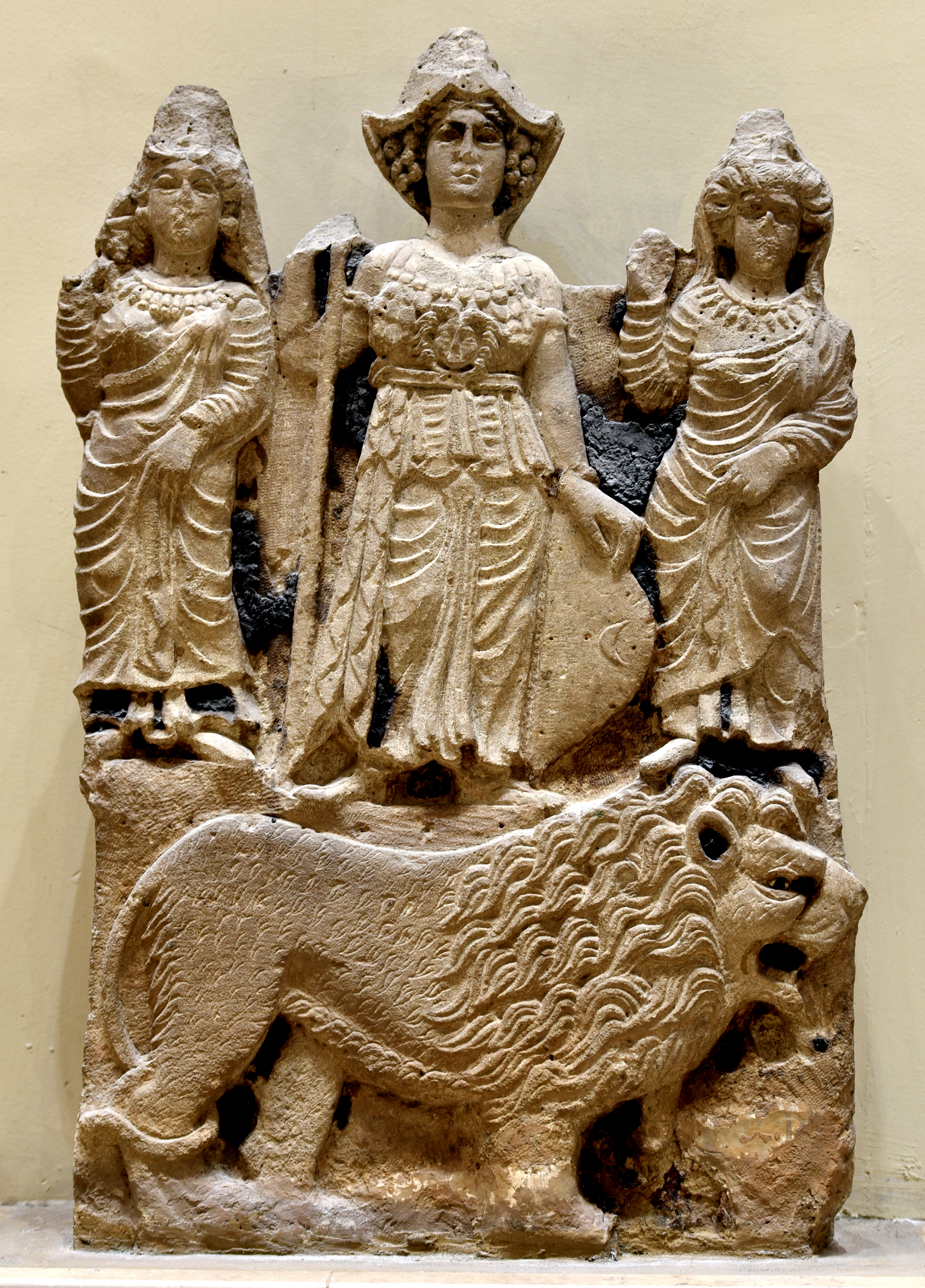
- 2nd century AD relief from Hatra depicting the goddess al-Lat flanked by two female figures, possibly goddesses al-Uzza and Manat. Iraq Museum
- Major cult center: Petra
- Symbol: Three trees
- Region: Arabia (Arabian Peninsula)

Genealogy
- Siblings: Al-Lat, Manāt

Al-ʻUzzá or al-ʻUzzā (Arabic: العُزَّى, pronounced [al ˈʕuzzaː]) was one of the three chief goddesses of Arabian religion in pre-Islamic times and she was worshipped by the pre-Islamic Arabs along with Al-Lat and Manāt. A stone cube at Nakhla (near Mecca) was held sacred as part of her cult. She is mentioned in Qur'an 53:19 as being one of the goddesses whom people worshiped.

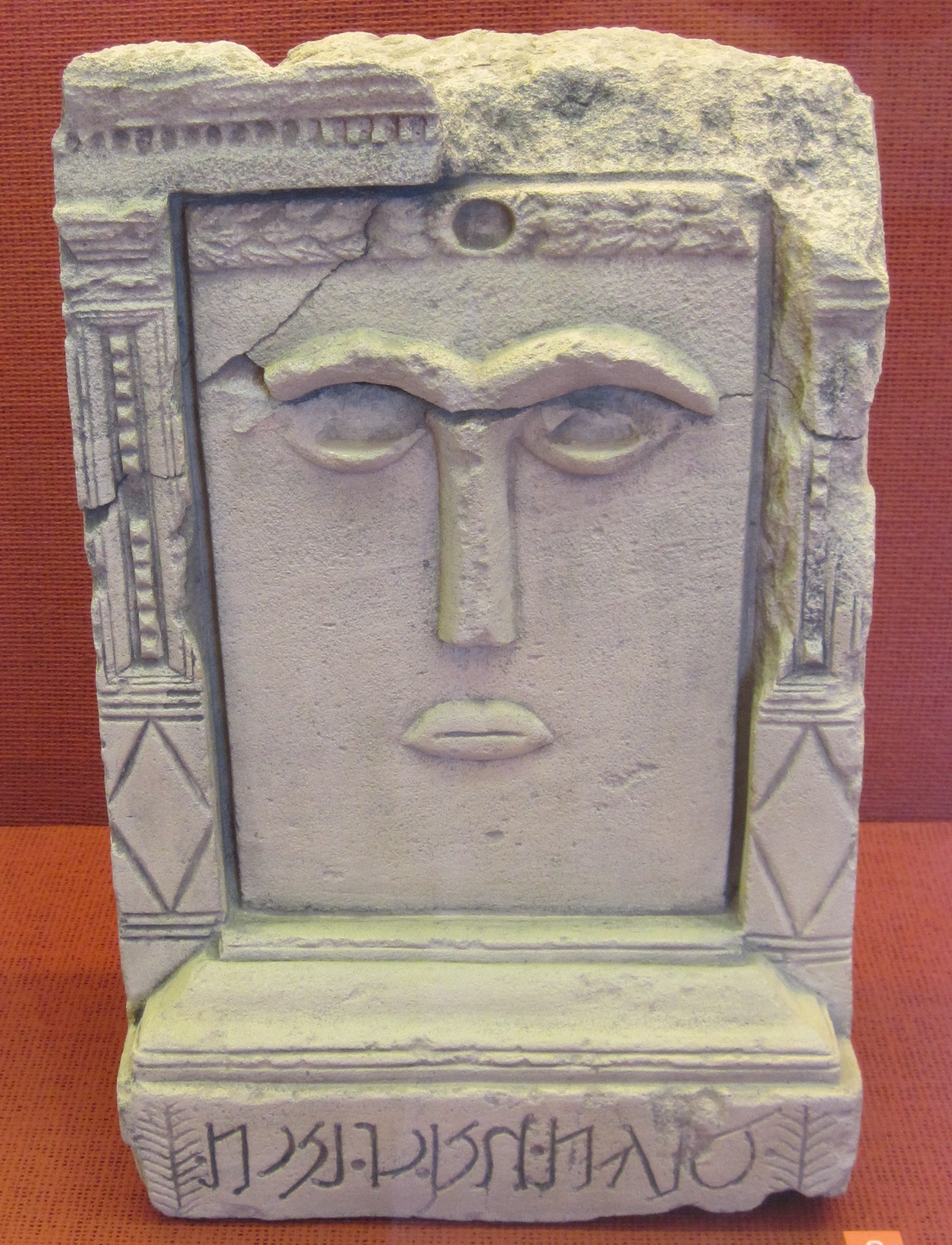
"Eye" imagery in many forms is associated with the goddess

Al-ʻUzzā, like Hubal, was called upon for protection by the pre-Islamic Quraysh. "In 624 at the 'battle called Uhud', the war cry of the Qurayshites was, "O people of Uzzā, people of Hubal!". Al-‘Uzzá also later appears in Ibn Ishaq's account of the alleged Satanic Verses.

The temple dedicated to al-ʻUzzā and the statue was destroyed by Khalid ibn al Walid in Nakhla in 630 AD.

== Cult of al-‘Uzzá ==
According to the Book of Idols (Kitāb al-Aṣnām) by Hishām ibn al-Kalbī

Over her [an Arab] built a house called Buss in which the people used to receive oracular communications. The Arabs as well as the Quraysh used to name their children "‘Abdu l-ʻUzzā". Furthermore, al-ʻUzzā was the greatest idol among the Quraysh. They used to journey to her, offer gifts unto her, and seek her favours through sacrifice.

The Quraysh used to circumambulate the Ka‘bah and say,

By al-Lāt and al-ʻUzzā,
And al-Manāt, the third idol besides.
Verily they are al-gharānīq
Whose intercession is to be sought.

This last phrase is said to be the source of the so-called Satanic Verses; the Arabic term al-gharānīq is translated as "most exalted females" by Faris in the Book of Idols, but he annotates this much-argued hapax legomenon in a footnote as "lit. Numidian cranes." Ibn al-Kalbi also relates that Muhammad once mentioned al-Uzza saying, “I have offered a white sheep to al-Uzza, while I was a follower of the religion of my people.”

Each of the three goddesses had a separate shrine near Mecca. The most prominent Arabian shrine of al-ʻUzzā was at a place called Nakhlah near Qudayd, east of Mecca toward aṭ-Ṭā’if; three trees were sacred to her there (according to a narration through al-'Anazi Abū-‘Alī in the Kitāb al-Aṣnām.)

She was the Lady ‘Uzzayan to whom a South Arabian offered a golden image on behalf of his sick daughter, Amat-‘Uzzayan ("the Maid of ‘Uzzayan")

‘Abdu l-‘Uzzá ["Slave of the Mightiest One"] was a favourite proper name before the advent of Islam. The name al-‘Uzzá appears as an emblem of beauty in late pagan Arabic poetry quoted by Ibn al-Kalbī, and oaths were sworn by her.

Susan Krone suggests that the identities of al-‘Uzzá and al-Lāt were fused in central Arabia uniquely.

On the authority of ‘Abdu l-Lāh ibn ‘Abbās, at-Tabari derived al-ʻUzzā from al-‘Azīz "the Mighty", one of the 99 "beautiful names of Allah" in his commentary on Qur'an 7:180.

== Destruction of temple ==
Shortly after the Conquest of Mecca, Muhammad began efforts to eliminate the last cult images reminiscent of pre-Islamic practices. He sent Khalid ibn Al-Walid during Ramadan 630 AD (8 AH) to a place called Nakhlah, where the goddess al-ʻUzzā was worshiped by the tribes of Quraish and Kinanah. The shrine's custodians were from Bani Shaiba. Al-ʻUzzā was considered the most important goddess in the region. This destruction is recounted by Arab Muslim historian Ibn al-Kalbī (c. 737–819 CE), telling how Muhammad ordered Khālid ibn al-Walīd to kill the pre-Islamic Arabian goddess al-ʿUzzā, who was supposed to inhabit one of three trees:

Khalid destroyed the first one, returned to Muhammad to report. Muhammad replied, asking whether something eventful happened, which Khalid denied. The same thing happened after cutting down the second tree. When Khalid was about to destroy the last tree, a woman with wild hair appeared, who is called "al Uzza" by al-Sulami the custodian of al-Uzza, and ordered to kill Khalid. Khalid struck the woman down with his sword, and chopped her head off at which she fell down in a pile of ashes. Khalid went on to kill Sulami and cut the last tree. When he returned to Muhammad, Muhammad is supposed to have said that the woman was al-Uzza, and she shall never be worshiped again.

However, Ibn Al-Kalbī's account is not considered a reliable source to the topic of pre-Islamic Arabian religion by some scholars. Already in the 9th century, the inaccuracy of Ibn al-Kalbi's is discussed in the Antiquities of South Arabia by Al-Hamdani and his account, or parts thereof, to the destruction of Nakhlah is also doubted by modern scholars. In contrast to Ibn Al-Kalbī claims of prevalent polytheism in southern Arabia up to Muhammad's time, for example, archeological evidence suggests that polytheistic practices have experienced considerable decline in the region long before Islam came. The only other mention to the destruction of Nakhlah is in the Sahih Bukhari hadith collection.

== Influence in other religions ==
=== Uzza the garden ===
According to Easton's Bible Dictionary, Uzza was a garden in which Manasseh and Amon were buried (2 Kings 21:18, 26). It was probably near the king's palace in Jerusalem, or may have formed part of the palace grounds. Manasseh may have acquired it from someone of this name. Another view is that these kings were culpable of idolatry and drew the attention of Ezekiel.

== See also ==
- List of pre-Islamic Arabian deities
