= Expedition of Khalid ibn al-Walid (Nakhla) =

Muslim military expedition to Nakhla in January 630 AD

The expedition of Khalid ibn al-Walid (Arabic: سرية خالد بن الوليد) to Nakhla took place in January 630 CE/Ramadan, 8 AH.

Khalid ibn al-Walid was sent to destroy the image of the Arabian goddess al-Uzza which was worshipped by local polytheists; he did this successfully.

== Expedition and demolition of Temple ==
Soon after the Conquest of Mecca, the Islamic prophet Muhammad began to dispatch expeditions on errands aiming at eliminating the last symbols reminiscent of pre-Islamic practices.

He sent Khalid bin Al-Walid in Ramadan 8 AH to Nakhlah where there was a statue of the goddess Al-‘Uzza worshipped by the Quraysh and Kinana tribes, and guarded by custodians from Banu Shaiban. Khalid, at the head of thirty horsemen, arrived at the spot and destroyed the goddess's religious statue.

Upon his return, Muhammad asked him if he had seen anything else there, to which Khalid replied that he had not. He was told that the statue had not been destroyed and that he must go back and fulfill the task. Khalid went again to Nakhlah and there saw a jinn in the form of a black Abyssinian (Ethiopian) woman, naked with disheveled hair. He struck her with his sword and cut her into "two pieces" killing her, according to the Muslim scholar, Saifur Rahman al Mubarakpuri. He returned once again and narrated his story to Muhammad, who then confirmed the fulfillment of the task, saying that the dead black Ethiopian woman was the real "al-Uzza".

== See also ==
- Military career of Muhammad
