= Ibn Sa'd =

Arab scholar, biographer and historian (784/5-845)

Muhammad ibn Sa'd ibn Mani' al-Hashimi
- Title: Katib al-Waqidi

Personal life
- Born: 168 AH (784/785 CE) Basra
- Died: 16 February 845 (aged 61) (230 AH)
- Era: Islamic golden age; (Early Abbasid era)
- Notable work(s): 'كتاب طبقات الكبرى', Kitab Tabaqat Al-Kubra (Book of the Major Classes)

Religious life
- Religion: Islam

Muslim leader
- Influenced by: Al-Waqidi

Abū ‘Abd Allāh Muḥammad ibn Sa‘d ibn Manī‘ al-Baṣrī al-Hāshimī or simply Ibn Sa'd (Arabic: ابن سعد) and nicknamed Scribe of Waqidi (Katib al-Waqidi), was a scholar and Arabian biographer. Ibn Sa'd was born in 168 AH (784/785 CE) and died on 16 February 845 CE (230 AH). Ibn Sa'd was from Basra, but lived mostly in Baghdad, hence the nisba al-Basri and al-Baghdadi respectively. He is said to have died at the age of 62 in Baghdad and was buried in the cemetery of the Syrian gate.

== Kitāb al-Ṭabaqāt al-Kabīr ==
The Kitāb al-Ṭabaqāt al-Kabīr (transl. The Major Book of Classes) is a compendium of biographical information (tabaqāt) about famous Islamic personalities. This eight-volume work contains the lives of Muhammad, his Companions and his Helpers, including those who fought at the Battle of Badr as a special class, and of the following generation, the Followers, who received their traditions from the Companions.

Ibn Sa'd's authorship of this work is attested in a postscript to the book added by a later writer. In this notice he is described as a "client of al-Husayn ibn ‘Abdullah of the ‘Abbasid family". The work was subject to a major study by a European scholar already in 1869.

=== Contents ===
- Books 1 and 2 contain a prophetic biography.
- Books 3 and 4 contain biographies of companions of Muhammad.
- Books 5, 6 and 7 contain biographies of later Islamic scholars.
- Book 8 contains biographies of Islamic women.

== Published editions ==
=== Arabic ===
- Ibn Saʻd, Muḥammad (1904–40). Sachau, Eduard; Brockelmann, Carl (eds.). Kitāb al-Ṭabaqāt al-kabīr : wa-huwa mushtamil aydan ʻalá al-Sīrah al-Sharīfah al-Nabawīyah / taṣnīf Muḥammad ibn Saʻd Kātib al-Wāqidī; ʻaniya bi-taṣḥīḥihi wa ṭabʻihi Idward Sakhaw; Kārl Brūkilmān كتاب الطبقات الكبير : وهو مشتمل أيضاً على السيرة الشريفة النبويّة. الجزء الثامن [Biographien Muhammeds, seiner gefährten und der späteren träger des Islams bis zum jahre 230 der flucht] (in Arabic). Vol. 9 vols. Leiden: Brill. (includes brief German synopses with page references for each book, reprinted in 2022 as Muḥammad Ibn Saʿd (13 January 2022). Biography of Muḥammad, His Companions and the Successors up to the Year 230 of the Hijra: Eduard Sachau's Edition of <i>Kitāb Al-Ṭabaqāt Al-Kabīr</i>. BRILL. ISBN 978-90-04-46989-1. OCLC 1291632208.online link
  - In 1968, Iḥsān Abbās edited it (Beirut: Dār Sādir).
- ‘Alī Muḥammad ‘Umar, ed. (2001). Kitāb al-ṭabaqāt al-kabīr. Cairo: Maktabat al-Khānjī. Contains 11 volumes.

=== English ===
- S. Moinul Haq (transl.), Ibn Sa'd's Kitab al-Tabaqat al-Kabir: Volume I, Parts I & II; Karachi: Pakistan Historical Society, 1967 [= Pakistan Historical Society Publication, no. 46]
- S. Moinul Haq (transl.), Ibn Sa'd's Kitab al-Tabaqat al-Kabir: Volume II, Parts I & II; Karachi: Pakistan Historical Society, 1972 [= Pakistan Historical Society Publication, no. 59]
- S. Moinul Haq (transl.), Ibn Sa'd's Kitab al-Tabaqat al-Kabir: Volume I ( Kitab Bhavan, New Delhi, 1981)
- S. Moinul Haq (transl.), Ibn Sa'd's Kitab al-Tabaqat al-Kabir: Volume ll ( Kitab Bhavan, New Delhi, 1981)
- Abridged translations of Volumes 3, 5, 6, 7 and 8 have been translated by Aisha Bewley and published under the titles of The Companions of Badr, The Men of Madina-II, The Scholars of Kufa, The Men of Madina-I, and The Women of Madina.

== See also ==
- List of Islamic scholars
- Prophetic biography
- List of biographies of Muhammad
