= Military career of Muhammad =

Muhammad
- أبو القاسم محمد بن عبدالله بن عبد المطلب; Abu al-Qasim Muhammad ibn 'Abdullah ibn Abd al-Muttalib
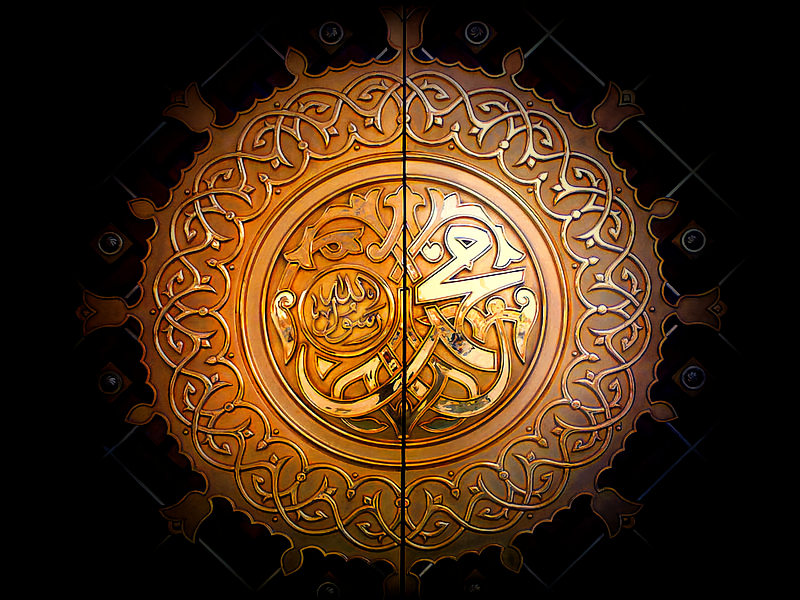
- Muhammad's name inscribed on the gates of the Prophet's Mosque in Medina
- Born: محمد بن عبدالله; Muhammad ibn 'Abdullah; 12 Rabi'I (c. 570); Mecca
- Died: 12 Rabi'I AH 11 (8 June 632); Medina
- Burial place: The Green Dome
- Spouse: Wives of Muhammad
- Children: Muhammad's children

The military career of Muhammad (c. 570 – 8 June 632), the Islamic prophet, encompasses several expeditions and battles throughout the Hejaz region in the western Arabian Peninsula which took place in the final ten years of his life, from 622 to 632. His primary campaign was against his own tribe in Mecca, the Quraysh. Muhammad proclaimed prophethood around 610 and later migrated to Medina after being persecuted by the Quraysh in 622. After several battles against the Quraysh, Muhammad conquered Mecca in 629, ending his campaign against the tribe.

Alongside his campaign against the Quraysh, Muhammad led campaigns against several other tribes of Arabia, most notably the three Arabian Jewish tribes of Medina and the Jewish fortress at Khaybar. He expelled the Banu Qaynuqa tribe for violating the Constitution of Medina in 624, followed by the Banu Nadir who were expelled in May 625 after being accused of plotting to assassinate him. In 627 Muhammad also besieged of Banu Qurayza and oversaw the execution of the tribe's fighting-age men. Finally, in 628, he besieged and invaded the Jewish fortress of Khaybar, which hosted more than 10,000 Jews, which Muslim sources say was retaliation for planning to ally themselves with the local Arab pagan tribes.

During the final years of his life, Muhammad sent several armies against the Byzantine Empire and the Ghassanids in northern Arabia and the Levant, before conquering Mecca in 630 and leading a campaign against some Arab pagan tribes close to Mecca, most notably in Ta'if. The last army led by Muhammad before his death was in the Battle of Tabuk in October 630. By the time he died in 632, Muhammad had managed to unite most of the Arabian Peninsula, laying the foundation for the subsequent Islamic expansion under the caliphates and defining Islamic military jurisprudence.

== Background ==
=== Muhammad's role in The Islamic Ghazwat ===
Major tribes of Arabia at the dawn of Islam c. 570 CE

In his prophetic biography (Arabic: السيرة النبوية, romanized: as-Seerat un-Nabawiyyah) titled The Sealed Nectar (Arabic: الرحيق المختوم, romanized: ar-Rahiq al-Makhtum), Safiur Rahman Mubarakpuri cites Ibn Hisham in saying that Muhammad took part in the Ghazwat Wars, which took place between an alliance of the Quraysh and the Kinanah and the Qais 'Ailan, when he was 15, saying that "his efforts were confined to picking up the arrows of the enemy as they fell, and handing them over to his uncles."

=== Expeditions ===
The following tables list all military expeditions of Muhammad, divided between ghazawāt (Arabic: غزوات; expeditions Muhammad led personally) and sarāyā (Arabic: سرايا; expeditions dispatched under another commander). The ghazawāt list follows al-Waqidi's count of 27.

==== Ghazawāt (led by Muhammad) ====
Ghazawāt — expeditions led by Muhammad personally
#	Name	Date (CE)	AH year	Opponent	Location	Outcome	Notes
1	Waddan (Abwāʾ)	Jan–Feb 623	1 AH	Quraysh / Banu Damra	Al-Abwa	No engagement; treaty with Banu Damra	First ghazwa; no fighting
2	Buwat	Mar 623	1 AH	Quraysh (Umayyad caravan)	Buwat	No engagement	Caravan escaped
3	Safwan (Badr I)	Mar–Apr 623	1 AH	Kurz ibn Jabir al-Fihri	Near Badr	No engagement	Pursuit of raider
4	Ushayra	May–Jun 623	2 AH	Quraysh caravan	Ushayra	No engagement; treaty with Banu Mudlij	
5	Badr	13 Mar 624	2 AH	Quraysh	Badr	Muslim victory	First major battle; 70 Quraysh killed, 70 captured
6	Banu Sulaym (Kudr)	Apr 624	2 AH	Banu Sulaym	Al-Kudr	No engagement	
7	Al-Sawiq	May 624	2 AH	Abu Sufyan (Quraysh reprisal)	Near Medina	No engagement	Quraysh retreated
8	Dhi Amr	Jan 625	3 AH	Banu Ghatafan / Banu Muharrib	Najd	No engagement	
9	Bahran	Feb–Mar 625	3 AH	Banu Sulaym	Bahran	No engagement	Largest force assembled to that point
10	Uhud	23 Mar 625	3 AH	Quraysh	Mount Uhud	Muslim tactical defeat	Muhammad wounded; Hamza killed; 70 Muslims killed
11	Hamra al-Asad	24 Mar 625	3 AH	Quraysh	Hamra al-Asad	Strategic Muslim recovery	Pursuit the day after Uhud; Abu Sufyan withdrew
12	Banu Nadir	Aug 625	4 AH	Banu Nadir	Medina (siege)	Expulsion of Banu Nadir	Tribe expelled northward to Khaybar
13	Dhat al-Riqa	Oct 625	4 AH	Banu Ghatafan / Banu Muharrib	Najd	No engagement	Fear prayer (Arabic: صلاة الخوف, romanized: ṣalāt al-khawf) reportedly instituted here
14	Badr II (Badr al-Mawʿid)	Apr 626	4 AH	Abu Sufyan (Quraysh)	Badr	Inconclusive; Quraysh withdrew	No fighting; Quraysh retreated after three days
15	Dumat al-Jandal	Aug 626	5 AH	Banu Kalb	Dumat al-Jandal	No engagement; tribe dispersed	Northernmost expedition to that point
16	Khandaq (Trench)	Jan–Feb 627	5 AH	Quraysh confederacy; Banu Ghatafan	Medina	Muslim defensive victory	Coalition of ~10,000 repelled; trench strategy devised by Salman al-Farsi
17	Banu Qurayza	Feb–Mar 627	5 AH	Banu Qurayza	Medina (siege)	Muslim victory	Men executed per arbitration of Sa'd ibn Mu'adh; women and children enslaved
18	Banu Lihyan	Jun 627	6 AH	Banu Lihyan	Hejaz	No engagement; tribe fled	Reprisal for Bi'r Ma'una massacre
19	Dhi Qarad (al-Ghabah)	Jun 627	6 AH	Uyayna ibn Hisn (Ghatafan)	Near Medina	Partial recovery of camels	Raid reprisal
20	Banu Mustaliq (Muraysiʿ)	Jan 628	6 AH	Banu Mustaliq	Al-Muraysiʿ	Muslim victory	Affair of the Necklace connected to this expedition
21	Hudaybiyyah	Mar 628	6 AH	Quraysh	Al-Hudaybiyyah	Treaty signed	Quran describes as "manifest victory" (48:1); pilgrimage deferred one year
22	Khaybar	May–Jun 628	7 AH	Jews of Khaybar; Banu Nadir	Khaybar	Muslim victory	Last major Jewish stronghold; kharaj tribute precedent established
23	Fulfilled Umrah (ʿUmrat al-Qaḍāʾ)	Mar 629	7 AH	—	Mecca	Peaceful entry	Pilgrimage completed per Hudaybiyyah terms; Meccans vacated city for three days
24	Conquest of Mecca	Jan 630	8 AH	Quraysh	Mecca	Muslim victory; largely bloodless	Abu Sufyan converts; general amnesty declared
25	Hunayn	Feb 630	8 AH	Hawazin; Thaqif	Hunayn valley	Muslim victory	Initial Muslim rout reversed; largest force assembled (12,000)
26	Taʾif	Feb–Mar 630	8 AH	Thaqif	Taʾif	Inconclusive siege; withdrawal	Thaqif converted voluntarily in 631
27	Tabuk	Oct–Nov 630	9 AH	Byzantine–Ghassanid frontier	Tabuk	No engagement; treaties with border tribes	Last ghazwa; army of ~30,000; northern limit of Muhammad's campaigns

==== Sarāyā (selected dispatched expeditions) ====
Sarāyā — selected expeditions dispatched under other commanders
Commander	Date (CE)	AH year	Opponent	Location	Outcome	Notes
Hamza ibn Abd al-Muttalib	Jul 623	1 AH	Quraysh caravan (Abu Jahl)	Coast near al-Is	No engagement	First sariyya on record
Ubaydah ibn al-Harith	Aug 623	1 AH	Quraysh caravan	Thaniyyat al-Murra	No engagement	
Sa'd ibn Abi Waqqas	Sep 623	1 AH	Quraysh caravan	Kharrar	No engagement	
Abdullah ibn Jahsh	Jan 624	2 AH	Quraysh	Nakhla	First Muslim blood shed	Amr ibn al-Hadrami killed; controversy over fighting in sacred month
Bi'r Ma'una	Aug 625	4 AH	Banu Amir / Sulaym (treachery)	Bi'r Ma'una	Ambush; Muslim massacre	70 Muslim reciters (qurra) killed; precipitated Banu Lihyan reprisal
Al-Raji	Sep 625	4 AH	Banu Lihyan (treachery)	Al-Raji	Ambush; 10 Muslims killed	Guides betrayed the party to Banu Lihyan
Muʾtah	Sep 629	8 AH	Byzantine–Ghassanid army	Muʾtah (modern Jordan)	Muslim defeat	Zayd ibn Haritha, Jaʿfar ibn Abi Talib, Abdullah ibn Rawaha killed; Khalid ibn al-Walid assumes command and withdraws
Usama ibn Zayd	Jun 632	11 AH	Byzantine frontier	Syria direction	Completed under Abu Bakr	Dispatched at Muhammad's death; first expedition of the Rashidun Caliphate

==== Notes on enumeration ====
The total count of ghazawāt varies by source: Ibn Ishaq counts 19, Ibn Sa'd and al-Waqidi both count 27, though with some differences in which expeditions are included. The sarāyā numbered between 35 and 48 depending on the source. Only sarāyā of significant historical consequence are listed above; for a complete list see List of expeditions of Muhammad.

=== Situation in Medina ===
Medina was divided into five tribes: two of them the Khazraj and Aws, while the Jews were represented by, from smallest to largest, the Banu Qaynuqa, Banu Nadir and Banu Quraizah. Upon his arrival in Medina, Muhammad set about the establishment of a pact known as the Constitution of Medina, to regulate the matters of governance of the city, as well as the extent and nature of inter-community relations, and signatories to it included the Muhajirun, the Ansar and the Jewish tribes of Medina. Significant clauses of the constitution included the mutual assistance of each other if one signatory were to be attacked by a third party, the resolution that the Muslims would profess their religion and the Jews theirs, as well as the appointment of Muhammad as the leader of the state.

And the threat to the life of both the Ansar and the Muhajireen was such that they were reported as having to sleep by their weapons all night. As tensions escalated the Muslims began to take defensive measures such as stationing guards around Muhammad and sending out reconnaissance patrols.

After initially refusing to accede to requests by his followers to fight the Meccans for continued persecution and provocation, he eventually proclaimed the revelations of the Quran:

"Permission to fight is given to those who are fought against because they have been wronged -truly Allah has the power to come to their support- those who were expelled from their homes without any right, merely for saying, 'Our Lord is Allah'...""-Surah 22:39–40

== History ==
=== Campaign against the Jews of Medina ===
==== Expulsion of the Banu Qaynuqa' ====
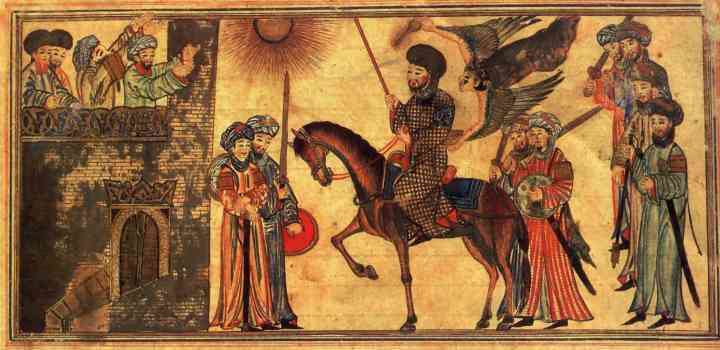
An illustration from the Jami' at-Tawareekh (c. 1314/1315) showing the submission of the Banu Nadir to Muhammad

In April 624, after the Battle of Badr, the Banu Qaynuqa violated the Constitution of Medina by shaming a Muslim woman by pinning and tearing her clothes. A Muslim man who witnessed this, killed the Jewish man responsible for it in retaliation. The Jews came in group against the Muslim and killed him. After a successive chain of similar revenge killings, enmity grew between Muslims and the Banu Qaynuqa', which led Muhammad to lay siege to their fortress. The Qaynuqa' had a strength of around 700. After being besieged for 14–15 days, the tribe eventually surrendered to Muhammad, who initially wanted to capture the men of Banu Qaynuqa', but ultimately yielded to Abdullah ibn 'Ubayy and agreed to expel the Qaynuqa'. The tribe eventually went northward toward Der'aa in modern-day Syria and assimilated themselves into the local Jewish population.

==== Expulsion of the Banu Nadir ====
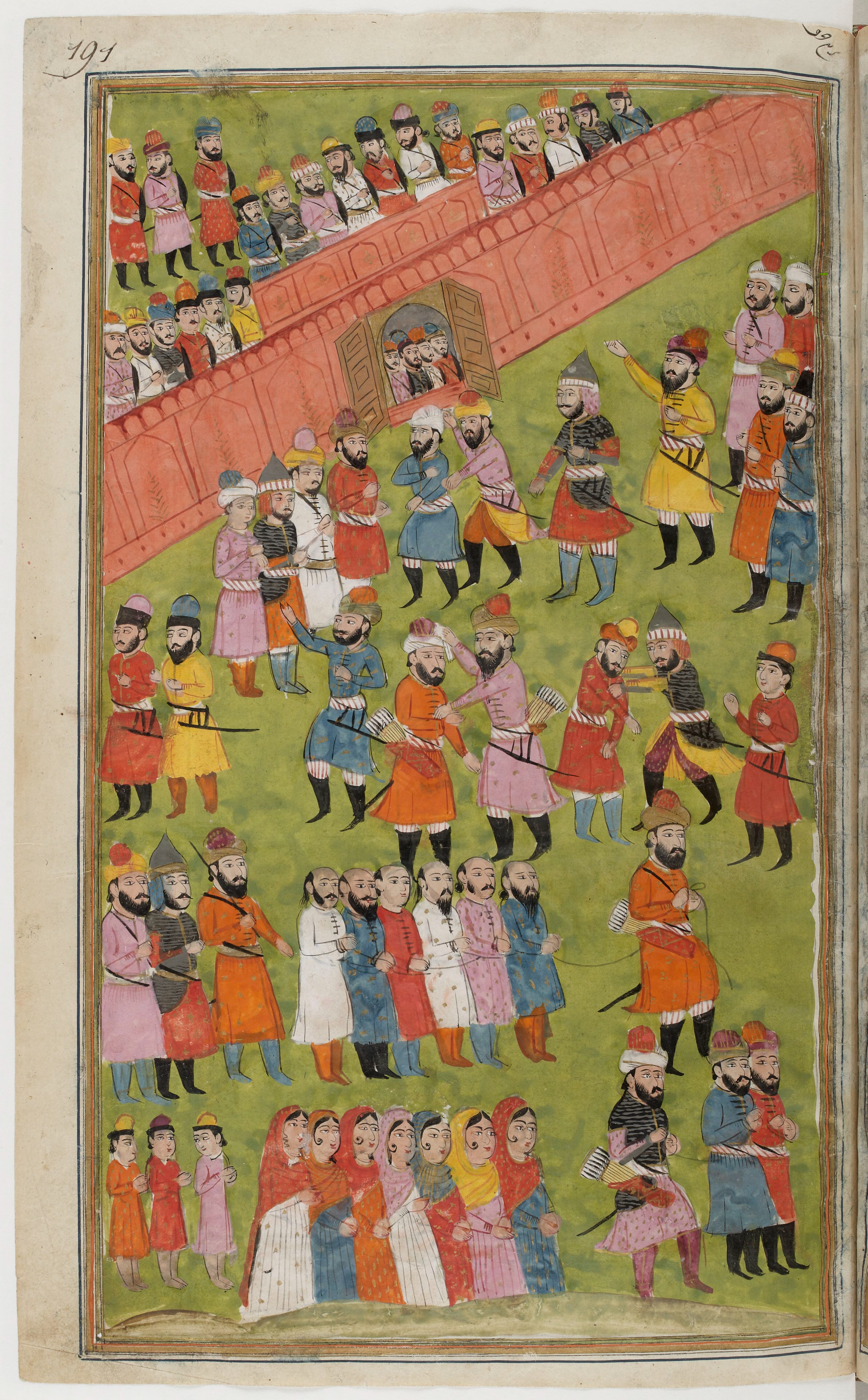
Seizure of the Banū Qurayza stronghold. Illustration from Hamla-i Haydari, by 18th-century artist Muhammad Rafi Bazil.

In May 625, Muhammad laid siege to the Banu Nadir, after he came to know that they were plotting to assassinate him. The siege is said to have lasted anywhere between six and fifteen days. Enjoying their strategic advantage due to the thick foliage of palm trees surrounding their castles, the Banu Nadir pelted the Muslims with stones and showered arrows upon them from their castles. In response, Muhammad is said to have commanded the burning of the palm trees. The tribe eventually surrendered and was expelled, moving northward toward Khaybar, another Jewish fort city around 150 km (95 mi) north of Medina and was captured again during the Battle of Khaybar. They were allowed to live around Khaybar until the Rashidun caliph, 'Umar ibn al-Khattab, expelled them for a second time.

==== Invasion of the Banu Qurayza ====
During the Battle of the Trench in December 626 and January 627, the Jewish tribe of Banu Qurayza, whose forts were located in southern Medina, were caught conspiring to ally themselves with the confederates and were charged with treachery. After the retreat of the coalition, Muslims besieged their forts, and they were the last of the Jewish tribes of Medina. The Banu Qurayza surrendered and all the men and one woman were beheaded, apart from a few who converted to Islam, while all the other women and children were enslaved.

In dealing with Muhammad's treatment of the Jews of Medina, aside from political explanations, western historians and biographers have explained it as "the punishment of the Medinan Jews, who were invited to convert and refused, perfectly exemplify the Quran's tales of what happened to those who rejected the prophets of old." Francis Edward Peters adds that Muhammad was possibly emboldened by his military successes and also wanted to push his advantage. Economical motivations, according to Peters, also existed since the poverty of the Meccan migrants was a source of concern for Muhammad. Peters argues that Muhammad's treatment of the Jews of Medina was "quite extraordinary" and is "quite at odds with Muhammad's treatment of the Jews he encountered outside Medina."

According to Welch, Muhammad's treatment of the three major Jewish tribes brought Muhammad closer to his goal of organizing a community strictly on a religious basis.

==== Siege of Khaybar ====
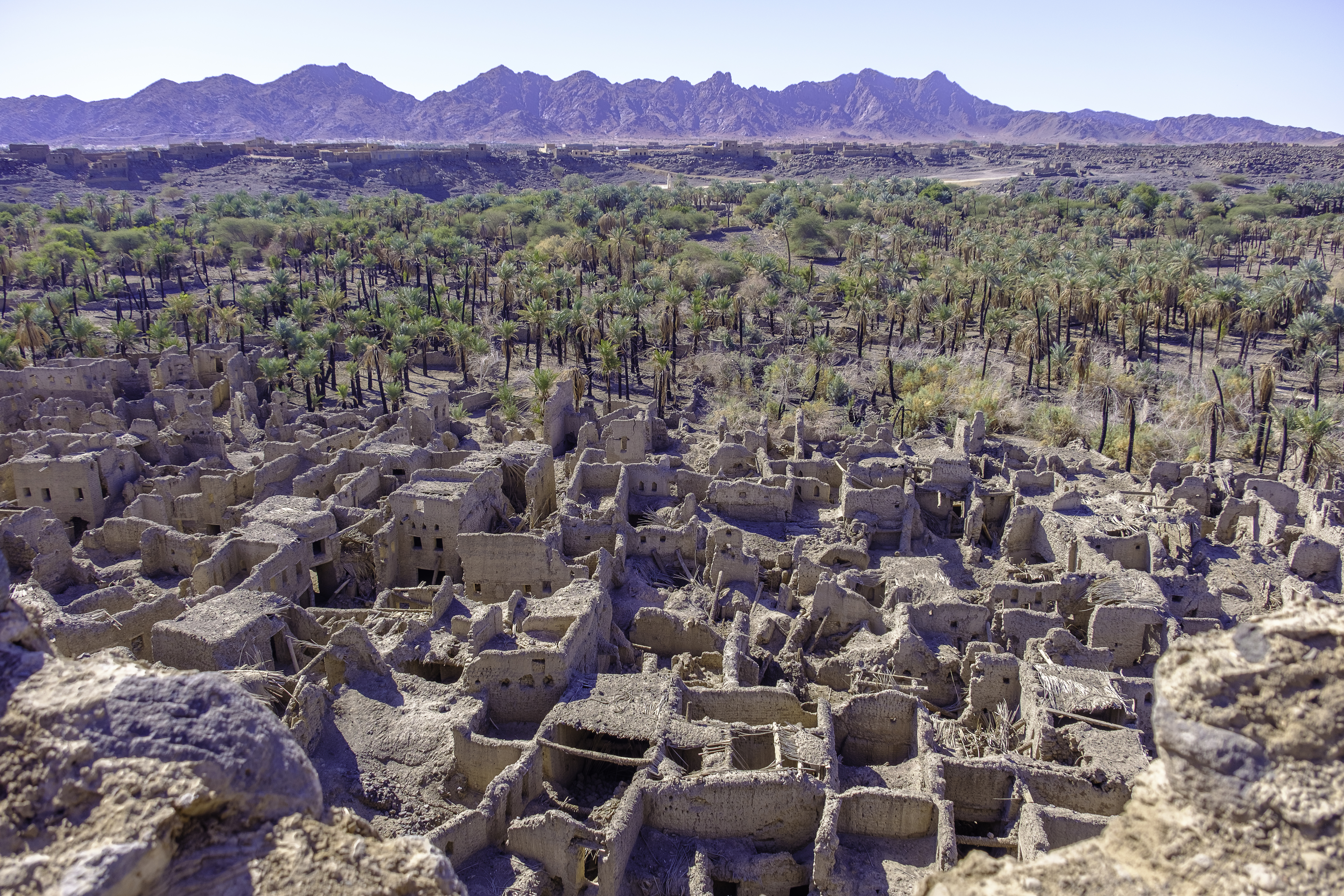
Aerial view of the deserted homes in Khaybar

In March 628, according to Muslims sources, the Jews of Khaybar, along with the Banu Nadir, who were exiled from Medina by Muhammad for violating the Constitution of Medina, and the Banu Ghatafan, were planning to attack the Muslims. When Muhammad learned of their alliance, he gathered an army of 1,500 soldiers and besieged the Jewish fortress at Khaybar. Scottish historian and orientalist, William Montgomery Watt agrees with this view. Italian orientalist Laura Veccia Vaglieri claims other motives pushed Muhammad to invade the forts of Khaybar.

On the other side, the Banu Ghatafan were afraid that the Muslims would attack them at any time, so they refused to help the Jews at Khaybar. After capturing six of the eight Jewish forts in Medina, the Jews of Khaybar finally surrendered and were allowed to live in the oasis on the condition that they would give one-half of their produce to the Muslims. Two Jewish commanders were killed in the siege.

They continued to live in the oasis for several more years until they were expelled by caliph 'Umar ibn al-Khattab. The imposition of tribute upon the conquered Jews served as a precedent for provisions in the Islamic law for the jizya.

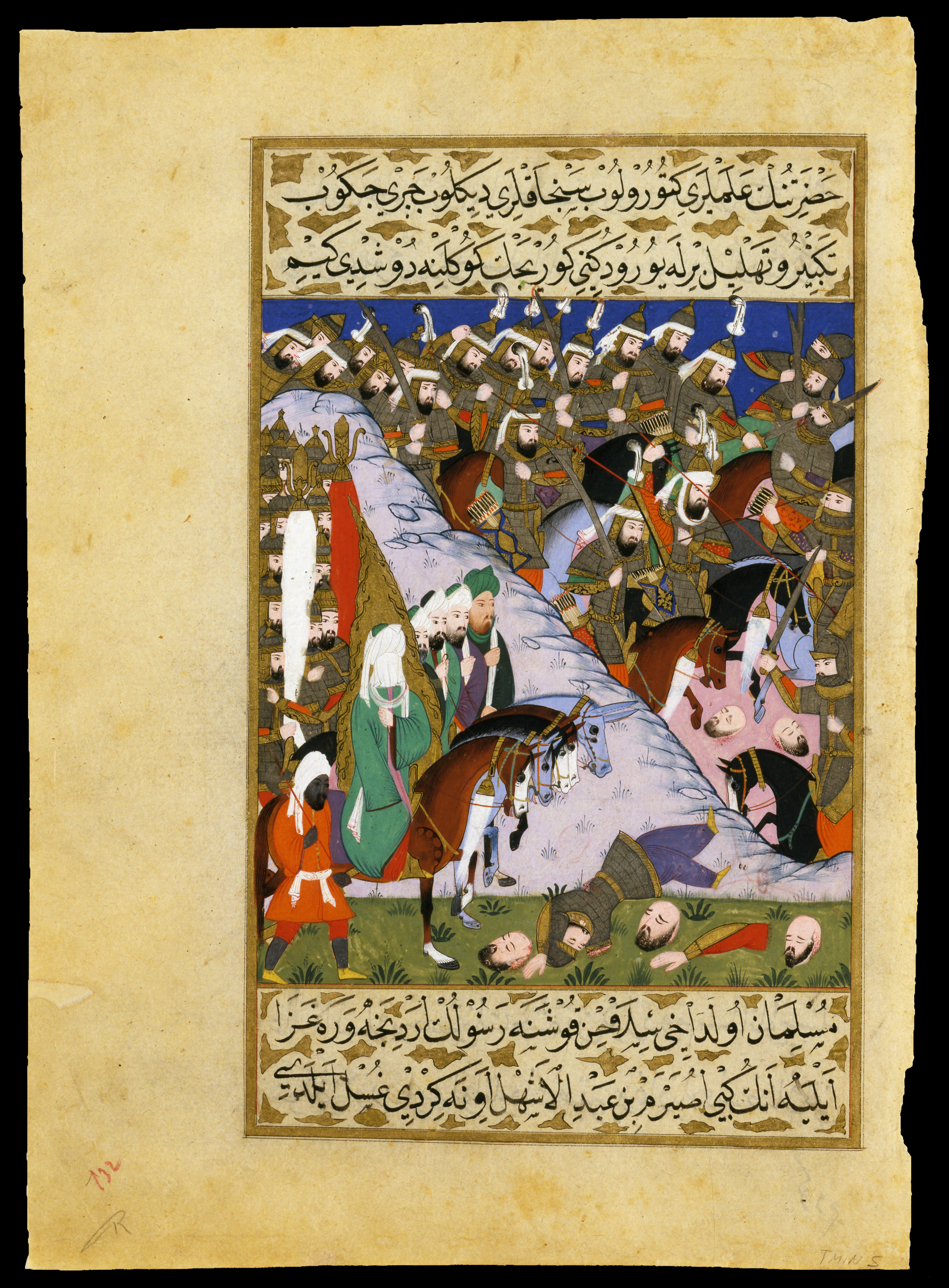
16th century illustration of Muhammad (depicted as veiled and surrounded by flames) supervising the Battle of Uhud

=== Byzantine campaign ===
In the final years of his life, after suppressing the two main factions that were leading in the opposition against him; the Meccans and the Jews, Muhammad led an active campaign against the main force in the north, the Byzantine Empire, which was involved in several wars against the Sasanian Empire, known as the Roman–Persian Wars.

Following a defeat in the Battle of Mu'tah in Muhammad's campaign against the Byzantine began with the final expedition led by Muhammad himself, the Tabuk expedition, which is also known as the Usra expedition. Muhammad heard of the gathering of a large Byzantine–Ghassanid alliance against the Muslims in Tabuk and led a force of some 30,000 men to look for them. After waiting and scouting for the enemy for twenty days, Muhammad returned to Medina.

== Statistics ==
The number of all casualties on all sides, in all the battles of Muhammad, is approximately 1,000. A contemporary Islamic scholar, Maulana Wahiduddin Khan, says that "during the 23-years in which this revolution was completed, 80 military expeditions took place. Fewer than 20 expeditions actually involved any fighting. 259 Muslims and 759 non-Muslims died in these battles – a total of 1018 dead." Most of those killed were men from the Banu Qurayza tribe after they surrendered to a siege as an aftermath of the Invasion of Banu Qurayza.

== Legacy ==
Javed Ahmed Ghamidi writes in Mizan that there are certain directives of the Qur’an pertaining to war which were specific only to Muhammad against divinely-specified peoples of his times (the polytheists and the Israelites and Nazarites of Arabia and some other Jews, Christians, et al.) as a form of divine punishment—for they had persistently denied the truth of Muhammad's mission even after it had been made conclusively evident to them by Allah through Muhammad, and asked the polytheists of Arabia for submission to Islam as a condition for exoneration and the others for jizya and submission to the political authority of the Muslims for military protection as the dhimmis of the Muslims. Therefore, after Muhammad and his companions, there is no concept in Islam obliging Muslims to wage war for propagation or implementation of Islam, hence now, the only valid reason for war is to end oppression when all other measures have failed. Though, up until the last 50 years, Jihad was seen mostly as an offensive military action to spread Islam's domain. (Jihad without Apologetics. Christopher J van der Krogt, Islam and Christian-Muslim Relations, vol. 21, no. 2, April 2010, pp. 127–142).

Offensive Jihad (Jihad al-Talab) is traditionally classified as a communal duty (Fard Kifayah) by the majority of classical Islamic jurists. Within traditional jurisprudence, some scholars argue that once a legal consensus (ijma) is established on the nature of this duty, it cannot be superseded by the opinions of later generations.

=== Jurisprudential views of the four madhabs ===
While there is a general consensus that Jihad al-Talab is a communal obligation, the four primary Sunni schools of law provide specific nuances regarding its implementation:

- Hanafi school: Classical Hanafi jurists, such as Al-Kasani, defined jihad as the active call to Islam and fighting those who oppose its spread. They maintain that the obligation is fulfilled if a sufficient group of Muslims provides defense and initiative.
- Maliki school: In the Maliki tradition, it is held that the Imam should ideally initiate a campaign against non-Muslim territory at least once a year to ensure the propagation of the faith.
- Shafi'i school: Al-Shafi'i emphasized that the purpose of offensive jihad is to ensure the supremacy of Islamic law, requiring at least one annual expedition if capability exists.
- Hanbali school: The Hanbali view aligns with the communal obligation, arguing fighting is necessary against those who hinder the spread of Islam.

=== Traditionalist critiques of modernist reinterpretations ===
Traditionalist critics argue that modern interpretations of jihad—which often restrict it solely to a defensive context—frequently deviate from the established methodologies of Usul al-Fiqh (principles of jurisprudence). These critics maintain that such modernists operate as "independent" interpreters (mujtahid), ignoring the cumulative weight of the four madhabs and the binding nature of historical consensus (ijma).

Furthermore, some scholars characterize these modern shifts as religious innovation (bid'ah). They contend that by bypassing traditional legal rules and prioritizing contemporary political frameworks over classical jurisprudence, modernists are not following the established rules of the four schools but are instead offering subjective, individualized opinions.

== See also ==
- Rules of war in Islam
- Types of Islamic Jihad
- List of expeditions of Muhammad
- Itmam al-Hujjah
- Muslim conquests

== Sources ==
- al-Waqidi (2011). Rizwi Faizer (ed.). The Life of Muhammad: Al-Wāqidī's Kitāb al-Maghāzī (PDF). Translated by Rizwi Faizer; Amal Ismail; AbdulKader Tayob. With an introduction by Rizwi Faizer and Andrew Rippin. Routledge.
- Pickthall, Muhammad M. (1930). The Quran.
- Rodgers, Russ (2012). The Generalship of Muhammad: Battles and Campaigns of the Prophet of Allah. University Press of Florida. ISBN 9780813042718.
- Watt, William Montgomery (1956). Muhammad at Medina. Oxford University Press.
