= Early Muslim–Meccan conflict =

Series of raids

- Part of the early Muslim conquests
Date	January 623 – December 629
Location	Arabian Peninsula
Result	Muslim victory; Subsequent conquest of Mecca

Belligerents
First Islamic State of Medina	Meccan Quraysh

Commanders and leaders
Muhammad ibn Abdullah; Hamza ibn Abd al-Muttalib; Abdullah ibn Abd al-Asad; Abdallah ibn Jahsh; Zayd ibn Haritha; Amir ibn al-Jarrah; Abu Qatada al-Ansari	Amr ibn Hisham; Umayyah ibn Khalaf; Sakhr ibn Harb; Miqsam ibn al-Rabi; Amr ibn Abd al-Wud; Tulayha ibn Khuwaylid; Uthman ibn Amir

The Islamic prophet Muhammad and his companions participated in a series of raids against the Quraysh tribe of Mecca. The raids were generally offensive and carried out to seize trade goods of caravans of the Quraysh. His followers were also impoverished. The raids were intended to harm the economy and in turn the offensive capabilities of Mecca by Muhammad. The Muslims felt that the raids were justified in that the items being sold in the caravans were their own items, stolen by the Meccans when they had migrated to Medina.

== Background ==
Muhammad's followers suffered from poverty after fleeing persecution in Mecca and migrating with Muhammad to Medina. Their Meccan persecutors seized their wealth and belongings left behind in Mecca.

Beginning in January 623, some of the Muslims resorted to the tradition of raiding the Meccan caravans that traveled along the eastern coast of the Red Sea from Mecca to Syria. Communal life was essential for survival in desert conditions, as people needed support against the harsh environment and lifestyle. The tribal grouping was thus encouraged by the need to act as a unit. This unity was based on the bond of kinship by blood. People of Arabia were either nomadic or sedentary, the former constantly traveling from one place to another seeking water and pasture for their flocks, while the latter settled and focused on trade and agriculture. The survival of nomads (or Bedouins) was also partially dependent on raiding caravans or oases, thus they saw this as no crime.

=== Earliest Quran verse about fighting ===
According to William Montgomery Watt and the Muslim scholar Ibn Kathir, the Quran verse 22:39 ^{[Quran 22:39]} was the earliest verse permitting Muslims to fight, saying "Sanction is given unto those who fight because they have been wronged; and Allah is indeed Able to give them victory". However, Watt says there was a "disinclination" among the Muslims to follow the permission to fight, but they were given an incentive, after the Muslims were told that God prefers fighters to those who sit still and remain at home, and that for fighters there is a reward in paradise (Jannah).

== Al-Is Caravan raid ==
According to Ar-Raheeq Al-Makhtum (The Sealed Nectar), a modern Islamic hagiography of Muhammad written by the Indian Muslim author Safi ur-Rahman Mubarakpuri, Muhammad ordered the first caravan raid led by Hamza ibn 'Abd al-Muttalib (Muhammad's uncle) seven to nine months after the Hijra. A party of thirty to forty men assembled at the seacoast near al-Is, between Mecca and Medina, where Amr ibn Hishām (Abu Jahl), the leader of the caravan was camping with three hundred Meccan riders.

Hamza met Abu Jahl there with a view to attack the caravan, but Majdi bin Amr al-Juhani, a Quraysh who was friendly to both the parties intervened between them; so, both parties separated without fighting. Hamza returned to Medina and Abu Jahl proceeded towards Mecca. Muhmmad also entrusted the first flag of Islam to Kinaz bin Husain an Ghanawi.

=== Islamic primary sources ===
It is mentioned in Ibn Hisham and Ibn Ishaq's biography of Muhammad (the earliest surviving biography of Muhammad from the 7th century), that for these caravan raids Muhammad gave permission to "plunder" the caravans of theirs enemies and seize their goods and property(s) and said:

Go forth against this caravan; it may be that God will grant you plunder [Ibn Ishaq and Ibn Hisham Sirat Rasul Allah, p. 95, translation by Folio Society]

The Muslim scholar Al-Waqidi also mentions in his Kitab al-Tarikh wa al-Maghazi ("Book of History and Campaigns") that Muhammad said: "This caravan of the Quraysh holds their wealth, and perhaps God will grant it to you as a plunder".

== Second raid ==
Ubaydah ibn al-Harith was the commander of the second raid. This raid took place nine months after the Hijra, a few weeks after the first one at al-Is.

About a month after Hamzah's unsuccessful bid to plunder, Muhammad entrusted a party of sixty Muhajirun led by Ubaydah to conduct another operation at a Quraysh caravan that was returning from Syria and protected by two hundred armed men. The leader of this caravan was Abu Sufyan ibn Harb.

The Muslim party went as far as Thanyatul-Murra, a watering place in Hejaz. No fighting took place, as the Quraysh were quite far from the place where Muslims were in the offing to attack the caravan. Nevertheless, Sa`d ibn Abi Waqqas shot an arrow at the Quraysh. This is known as the first arrow of Islam. Despite this surprise attack, no fighting took place and the Muslims returned empty-handed. It is believed that Ubaydah was the first to carry the banner of Islam; others say Hamzah was the first to carry the banner .

The incident is partly referenced in the Sahih al-Bukhari hadith collection:

I heard Sa'd saying, "I was the first amongst the 'Arabs who shot an arrow for God's Cause. We used to fight along with the Prophet".Sahih al-Bukhari, 5:57:74

== Kharrar raid (3rd raid) ==
Sa`d ibn Abi Waqqas was ordered to lead the third raid. His group consisted of about twenty Muhajirs. This raid was done about a month after the previous. Sa'd, with his soldiers, set up an ambush in the valley of Kharrar on the road to Mecca and waited to raid a returning Meccan caravan from Syria. But the caravan had already passed and the Muslims returned to Medina without a fight.

== Invasion of Waddan ==
The fourth raid, known as the invasion of Waddan, was the first offensive in which Muhammad took part personally with 70, mostly Muhajir, troops. It is said that twelve months after moving to Medina, Muhammad himself led a caravan raid to Waddan (Al-Abwa). The aim was to intercept the caravans of the Quraysh. The raid party did not meet any Quraysh during the raid.

But the caravan of the Banu Damrah was raided. Negotiations began and the two leaders signed a treaty of non-aggression. Banu Damrah pledged to not attack Muslims or side with the Quraysh; and Muhammad pledged to not attack the caravans of Banu Damrah or seize their goods.

According to Muslim scholar Muhammad al-Zurqani, the provisions of the pact/treaty go as follows:

This document is from Muhammad, the messenger of God, concerning the Banu Darmah. In which he (Muhammad) established them safety and security in their wealth and lives. They can expect support from the Muslims, unless they betray this agreement and break this treaty. They are also expected to respond positively if the prophet sought their help.

== Buwat caravan raid (5th raid) ==
The fifth raid, known as the invasion of Buwat, was also commanded by Muhammad. A month after the raid at al-Abwa, he personally led 200 men including Muhajirs and Ansars to Bawat, a place on the caravan route of the Quraysh merchants. A herd of 1,500 camels, accompanied by 100 riders under the leadership of Umayyah ibn Khalaf, a Quraysh.

According to Muslim scholars Ibn Hisham and Ibn Ishaq's the purpose of these raid were to plunder this rich Quraysh caravan, it is mentioned in their biography of Muhammad (the earliest surviving biography of Muhammad from the 7th century) that for these caravan raids Muhammad gave permission to "plunder" the caravans of theirs enemies and seize their goods and property(s) and said: "Go forth against this caravan; it may be that Allah will grant you plunder. The Muslim scholar Al-Waqidi also mentions the same.

No battle took place and the raid resulted in no booty. This was due to the caravan taking an untrodden unknown route. Muhammad then went up to Dhat al-Saq, in the desert of al-Khabar. This was the first raid where a few Ansars took part. The caravan was led by 100 Quraysh and 2,500 camels were with them.

== Sixth raid ==
Two or three months after Muhammad's return from Buwat, he appointed Abu Salamah Ibn Abd al-Assad to take his place in Medina while he was away commanding another raid. Between 150 and 200 followers joined this operation to al-Ushayra, Yanbu in either the month of Jumada I or Jumada II.

They had 30 camels that they rode upon by turns. When they arrived at al-Usharayh, they expected to raid a rich Meccan caravan heading towards Syria led by Abu Sufyan. Muhammad already had the knowledge of this caravan's departure from Mecca and waited for about a month for this caravan to pass. But the Meccan caravan had already passed.

In this operation, Muhammad entered into an alliance with Banu Madlaj, a tribe inhabiting the vicinity of al-Ushayra. He also concluded another treaty that was made with Banu Damrah previously. All those treaties established good political connections for him.

== Nakhla raid ==
The Nakhla Raid was the seventh caravan raid and the first successful raid against the Meccans. Abdullah ibn Jahsh was the Commander .

It took place in Rajab 2 A.H., i.e. January 624 A.H. Muhammad despatched 'Abdullah bin Jahsh Asadi to Nakhlah at the head of 12 Emigrants with six camels.

After his return from the first Badr encounter (Battle of Safwan), Muhammad sent Abdullah ibn Jahsh in Rajab with 8 or 12 men on a fact-finding operation. Abdullah ibn Jahsh was a maternal cousin of Muhammad. He took along with him Abu Haudhayfa, Abdullah ibn Jahsh, Ukkash ibn Mihsan, Utba b. Ghazwan, Sa'd ibn Abi Waqqas, Amir ibn Rabia, Waqid ibn Abdullah and Khalid ibn al-Bukayr. Muhammad gave Abdullah ibn Jahsh a letter, but not to be read until he had traveled for two days and then to do what he was instructed to do in the letter without putting pressure on his companions. Abdullah proceeded for two days, then he opened the letter; it told him to proceed until he reached at Nakhla, between Mecca and Taif, lie in wait for the Quraysh and observe what they were doing. The sacred months of the Arab Pagans were the 1st, 7th, 11th and 12th months of the Islamic calendar according to the Muslim scholar Safiur Rahman Mubarakpuri

Muhammad initially disapproved of that act and suspended any action as regards the camels and the two captives on account of the prohibited months . The Arab Pagans, exploited this opportunity to accuse the Muslims of violating what is Divinely inviolable (fighting in the months considered sacred to the Arab pagans). This idle talk brought about a painful headache to Muhammad's Companions, until at last they were relieved when Muhammad revealed a verse regarding fighting in the sacred months

"They ask you concerning fighting in the sacred months (i.e. 1st, 7th, 11th and 12th months of the Islamic calendar). Say, 'Fighting therein is a great (transgression) but a greater (transgression) with God is to prevent mankind from following the way of God, to disbelieve in Him, to prevent access to Al-Masjid-Al-Harâm (at Makkah), and to drive out its inhabitants, and Al-Fitnah is worse than killing." ^{[Quran 2:217]}

According to Ibn Qayyim, he said "most of the scholars have explained the word Fitnah here as meaning Shirk"

=== Aftermath after new Quran verse revealed ===
According to Ibn Kathir, Muhammad refused to accept ransom until he was sure his companions were safe. He also threatened to kill the captives "For we fear for their safety with you. If you kill them, we will kill your people", Ibn Kathir cites Ibn Ishaqs 7th century biography of Muhammad as the primary source for this quote. The Muslim scholar Muhammad Husayn Haykal also mentions this and said the verse which permitted Muslims to fight in the months which were considered sacred by the Arab pagans (i.e. 1st, 7th, 11th and 12th months of the Islamic calendar) had "brought the Muslims relief", and that then Muhammad had accepted his share of the booty

Soon after his release, al-Hakam bin Kaysan, one of the two prisoners captured, became a Muslim. Mubarakpuri mentions that the Quran verse 47:20 was also sent down, dispraising the hypocrites and cowards who are scared of fighting, and exhorted Muslims to fight.

== Nejd caravan raid (8th raid) ==
The Nejd Caravan Raid took place in Jumad at Thaniya, in the year 3 A.H. The Meccan polytheists lived on trade and as summer approached, it was time for the Meccans to leave for Syria for their seasonal trade business.

After receiving intelligence, Zayd ibn Harithah went after the caravan (after receiving orders from Muhammad), and they successfully raided it and captured 100,000 Dirham's worth of booty. Safan (the caravan leader) and his guards fled away. As a result, the Muslims foiled the Quraysh plan to find another trade route.

== Expedition of Zaid ibn Haritha in Al-Is (9th raid) ==
The expedition of Zaid ibn Haritha in al-Is took place in September, 627 AD, 5th month of 6 AH of the Islamic calendar.

Zaid bin Haritha, at the head of a 170 horsemen, set out to a place called Al-'Ais, intercepted a caravan of Quraish led by Abu al-Aas ibn al-Rabee, Muhammad's son-in-law (Zainab bint Muhammad's husband) and captured their camels as booty.

Abu al-Aas was released at the insistence of Muhammad's daughter Zainab bint Muhammad. The whole caravan, including a large store of silver was captured and some of those who guarded it, taken prisoners.

== Expedition of Abu Ubaidah ibn al Jarrah (10th raid) ==
The expedition of Abu Ubayda ibn al-Jarrah, also known as the "Expedition of Fish" and "Invasion of al-Khabt", took place in October 629 AD, 8 AH, 7th month, of the Islamic calendar, or according to some scholars in 7 AH, 4th month.

Muhammad sent Abu Ubaidah ibn al-Jarrah along with 300 men to attack and chastise the tribe of Juhaynah at al-Khabat, on the seacoast, five nights journey from Medina. He was sent to observe a Quraysh caravan. There was no fighting as the enemy fled after they heard of the arrival.

This expedition is famous because the Muslims were short of supplies and food was running out, and they were fighting for survival, they suffered from famine. In the end, the Muslims found a sperm whale that came ashore and ate it for twenty days. Ibn Hisham mentions the incident in detail. This is why it is also known as the 'expedition of fish.' They brought some of the stale meat to Muhammad and he ate it too.

== Expedition of Abu Qatadah ibn Rab'i al-Ansari, Batn Edam (11th raid) ==
The expedition of Abu Qatadah ibn Rab'i al-Ansari, to Batn Edam (also spelt Idam) took place in November 629 AD, 8 AH, 8th month, of the Islamic calendar

Muhammad was planning on attacking Mecca, with view of securing a complete news black-out concerning his military intentions, then Muhammad despatched an 8-man platoon under the leadership of Abu Qatadah bin Rab'i in the direction of Edam, a short distance from Medina, in Ramadan 8 A.H., in order to divert the attention of people from his main target of attacking Mecca, with which he was pre-occupied.

According to Ibn Sa'd, Ibn Hisham, and many Sunni hadith collections, a Bedouin caravan passed by and they greeted the Muslims with Assalamu Alaikum. But Abu Qatadah attacked the caravan anyway and killed the people. They returned to Muhammad with the flock they captured and told him the story.

Muhammad then had revealed to him the verse 4:94. Ibn Kathir interprets this as, God asking Muslims to be more careful when killing Muslims accidentally.

== Permission to fight ==
fg The permission to fight was given in many stages during Muhammad's prophetic mission:

- At first, the Muslims were not allowed to fight
- Then, The Muslims were only allowed to fight the Meccan Quraysh, because they were the first to oppress the Muslims in Mecca. Muslims were allowed to seize their goods, but not those tribes which the Muhammad made a treaty with.
- Then, Muhammad and the Muslims were allowed to fight pagan tribes that allied with the Quraysh.
- Then Muhammad and the Muslims were allowed to fight the Jewish tribes of Medina, when these tribes violated the Constitution of Medina and their pact with the Muslims.
- If the People of the Book paid a tax (jizya) for protection from foreign enemies, then the Muslims were forbidden to fight them.
- Muslims were required to make peace with any polytheists, Jews or Christians who embraced Islam, and were required to embrace them as fellow Muslims.
- Then, Muhammad and the Muslims forgave the Meccans for their crimes against them after the Muslims returned to Mecca.

== See also ==
- List of expeditions of Muhammad
- Muslim–Quraysh War

== Notes (main sources used) ==
- Mubarakpuri, Saifur Rahman Al (2002), When the Moon Split, DarusSalam, ISBN 978-9960-897-28-8
- Mubarakpuri, Saifur Rahman Al (2005), The Sealed Nectar (Free Version), Darussalam Publications, ISBN 979-8-6941-4592-3. Note: This is the free version available on Google Books
- Mubarakpuri, Saifur Rahman Al (2005), The sealed nectar: biography of the Noble Prophet, Darussalam Publications, ISBN 978-9960-899-55-8
- Muḥammad Ibn ʻAbd al-Wahhāb, Imam (2003). Mukhtaṣar zād al-maʻād. Darussalam publishers Ltd. ISBN 978-9960-897-18-9.
- Abu Khalil, Shawqi (1 March 2004). Atlas of the Prophet's biography: places, nations, landmarks. Dar-us-Salam. ISBN 978-9960-897-71-4.
- Muir, William (1861), The life of Mahomet and history of Islam to the era of the Hegira, Volume 4, Smith, Elder & Co, Original from: Harvard University (according to Google books).
