= Expedition of Zayd ibn Harithah =

The Expedition of Zaid ibn Haritha may refer to any of several raids and other military expeditions by Zayd ibn Harithah on behalf of Muhammad:

- Expedition of Zayd ibn Harithah (Al-Jumum), September 627 AD (6 AH)
- Expedition of Zayd ibn Harithah (Wadi al-Qura), November, 627 AD (6 AH)
  - Second Expedition of Wadi al-Qura, January, 628 AD, (6 AH). Raid carried out by Zayd ibn Harithah or Abu Bakr
- Expedition of Zayd ibn Harithah (Al-Is), September, 627 AD (6 AH)
- Expedition of Zayd ibn Harithah (Hisma), October, 628 AD (7 AH)

== See also ==
- Zayd ibn Harithah
- List of expeditions of Muhammad
