= Banu Muzaina =

Banu Muzaina بنو مزينة
- Nisba: Muzani
- Religion: Paganism and later Islam

Banu Muzaina (Arabic: بنو مزينة) was an Arab tribe during the time of the Islamic prophet Muhammad. They were involved in the Expedition of Zayd ibn Harithah in September, 627 CE, 6AH of the Islamic calendar A platoon, under the leadership of Zaid bin Haritha, was sent to Al Jumum, the habitation of Banu Salim, in the same year. A group of non-Muslims were captured. A woman from Banu Muzaina was also captured, and she showed them the way to the enemy's camp. The Banu Muzaina tribe was an Arab pagan tribe which later converted to Islam.

== Notable people ==
- Al-Nu'man ibn Muqrin
- Ka'b ibn Zuhayr
- Zuhayr ibn Abī Sūlmā

== See also ==
- List of expeditions of Muhammad
