= Muhajirun =

Muhammad's companions who migrated to Medina from Mecca

The Black Standard
- Flag commonly associated with the Muhajirun

The Muhajirun (Arabic: المهاجرون, romanized: al-muhājirūn, lit. 'migrants/emigrants', singular مهاجر, muhājir) were the converts to Islam and the Islamic prophet Muhammad's advisors and relatives, who emigrated from Mecca to Medina; the event is known in Islam as the Hijra. The early Muslims from Medina are called the Ansar ("helpers").

== During Muhammad's era ==
About a month after Hamzah's unsuccessful attack in the first caravan raid, Muhammad entrusted a party of sixty Muhajirun led by Ubaydah to conduct another operation at a Quraysh caravan that was returning from Syria and protected by one hundred men. The leader of this caravan was Abu Sufyan ibn Harb. The Muslim party went as far as Thanyatul-Murra, a watering place in Hejaz. No fighting took place, as the Quraysh were quite far from the place where Muslims were in the offing to attack the caravan. Nevertheless, Sa`d ibn Abi Waqqas shot an arrow at the Quraysh. This is known as the first arrow of Islam. Despite this surprise attack, no fighting took place and the Muslims returned empty-handed. It is believed that Ubaydah was the first to carry the banner of Islam; others say Hamzah was the first to carry the first banner.

Sa`d ibn Abi Waqqas was ordered to lead the third raid. His group consisted of about twenty Muhajirs. This raid was done about a month after the previous. Sa'd, with his soldiers, set up an ambush in the valley of Kharrar on the road to Mecca and waited to raid a returning Meccan caravan from Syria. But the caravan had already passed and the Muslims returned to Medina without a fight.

The fourth raid, known as the invasion of Waddan, was the first offensive in which Muhammad took part personally with 70, mostly Muhajir, troops. It is said that twelve months after moving to Medina, Muhammad himself led a caravan raid to Waddan (Al-Abwa). The aim was to intercept the caravans of the Quraysh. The raid party did not meet any Quraysh during the raid.

The fifth raid, known as the invasion of Buwat, was also commanded by Muhammad. A month after the raid at al-Abwa, he personally led 200 men including Muhajirs and Ansars to Bawat, a place on the caravan route of the Quraysh merchants. A herd of 1,500 camels, accompanied by 100 riders under the leadership of Umayyah ibn Khalaf, a Quraysh. The purpose of these raids was to get back what they had lost when they migrated from Mecca to Medina to avoid persecution by Quraysh for practicing their religion. Quraysh seized the property and belongings left behind by Muslims and sold those. The caravan was led by 100 Quraysh and 2,500 camels were with them.

== Name of people ==
=== Men ===
- Abu Bakr, First Rashidun Caliph
- Zaid Bin Haritha
- Uthman, Third Rashidun Caliph
- Ali ibn Abi Talib, Fourth Rashidun Caliph
- Hamza ibn Abdul-Muttalib, uncle of Muhammad
- Al-‘Abbas ibn ‘Abd al-Muttalib, uncle of Muhammad, and the progenitor of Banu Abbas
- Salman the Persian
- Bilal ibn Rabah
- Saeed Bin Zaid
- Talha Bin Obaidullah
- Obaidullah Bin Al Jarrah
- Musa'b Bin Umair
- Ja'far Bin Abi Talib
- Sa'ad ibn Abi Waqqas
- Zubair Bin Awwam
- Umar Second Rashidun Caliph
- Usman Bin Maza'un
- Khabbab Bin Al Arat
  - Abu Hudhaifah bin Yaman
  - Abdul Rahman bin A'uf
  - Abdullah bin Masood
- Suhaib Rumi
- Tamim Dari
- Khunais ibn Hudhaifa
- Abu Dharr al-Ghifari
- Miqdad ibn Aswad
- Ammar ibn Yasir
- Abu Buraidah al-Aslami
- Khalid ibn Sa`id

=== Women ===
- Sawda bint Zamʿa second wife of Muhammad
- Aisha third wife of Muhammad
- Fatimah bint Asad, wife of Abu Talib, mother of ‘Ali, and an aunt of Muhammad
- Asmā' bint Abi Bakr, wife of Zubayr, and sister-in-law of Muhammad.
- Lubaba bint al-Harith, wife of Al-‘Abbas, and an aunt and sister-in-law of Muhammad
- Umm Ruman, wife of Abu Bakr, and mother-in-law of Muhammad through Aisha.
- Umme Habibah Bint Abu Sufyan wife of Muhammad
- Safiyah Bint Abdul Muttalib

==== Daughters of Muhammad ====
- Fatima, daughter of Muhammad and the wife of Ali ibn Abi Talib
- Ruqayya, daughter of Muhammad and a wife of Uthman ibn Affan
- Umm Kulthum, daughter of Muhammad, and a wife of Uthman Ibn Affan
- Zaynab, daughter of Muhammad and a wife of Abu al-As ibn al-Rabi'
- Umamah bint Zainab, grand daughter of Muhammad and a wife of Ali ibn Abi Talib

== See also ==
- Hagarenes
- Ishmaelites
- Magarites
- Muhajir
- Brotherhood among the Sahaba
- Sunni view of the Sahaba
- List of expeditions of Muhammad
