= Waddan =

Waddan may refer to:

- Waddan, Libya, a town in Libya
- Barbary sheep, the North African Barbary sheep
- Invasion of Waddan, a 7th-century battle in modern Saudi Arabia
