= Qarqarat al-Kudr =

Qarqarat al-Kudr is a place in Saudi Arabia near Khaybar. During the Islamic prophet Muhammad's era, the Al Kudr Invasion took place here against the Banu Salim tribe. It was a watering place at the time.

The Banu Salim tribe lived in Nejd at the time.

== See also ==
- List of expeditions of Muhammad
