= Al-Usharayh =

Al-Ushayrah is an area that existed around the time of the Islamic prophet Muhammad. Muhammad carried out the Invasion of Dul Ashir there. Muhammad had thirty camels that they rode upon by turns. When they arrived at al-Usharayh, they expected to raid a rich Meccan caravan towards Syria led by Abu Sufyan. Muhammad already had the knowledge of this caravan's departure from Mecca and waited for about a month for this caravan to pass. But the Meccan caravan had already passed.

In this operation, Muhammad entered into an alliance with Banu Madlaj, a tribe inhabiting the vicinity of al-Ushayra. He also concluded another treaty that was made with Banu Damrah previously.

== See also ==
- List of expeditions of Muhammad
