= Al Jum'ah Mosque =

Mosque in Medina, Saudi Arabia

- Arabic: مَسْجِد ٱلْجُمُعَة, romanized: Masjid Al-Jumuʿah, lit. 'The Friday Mosque'
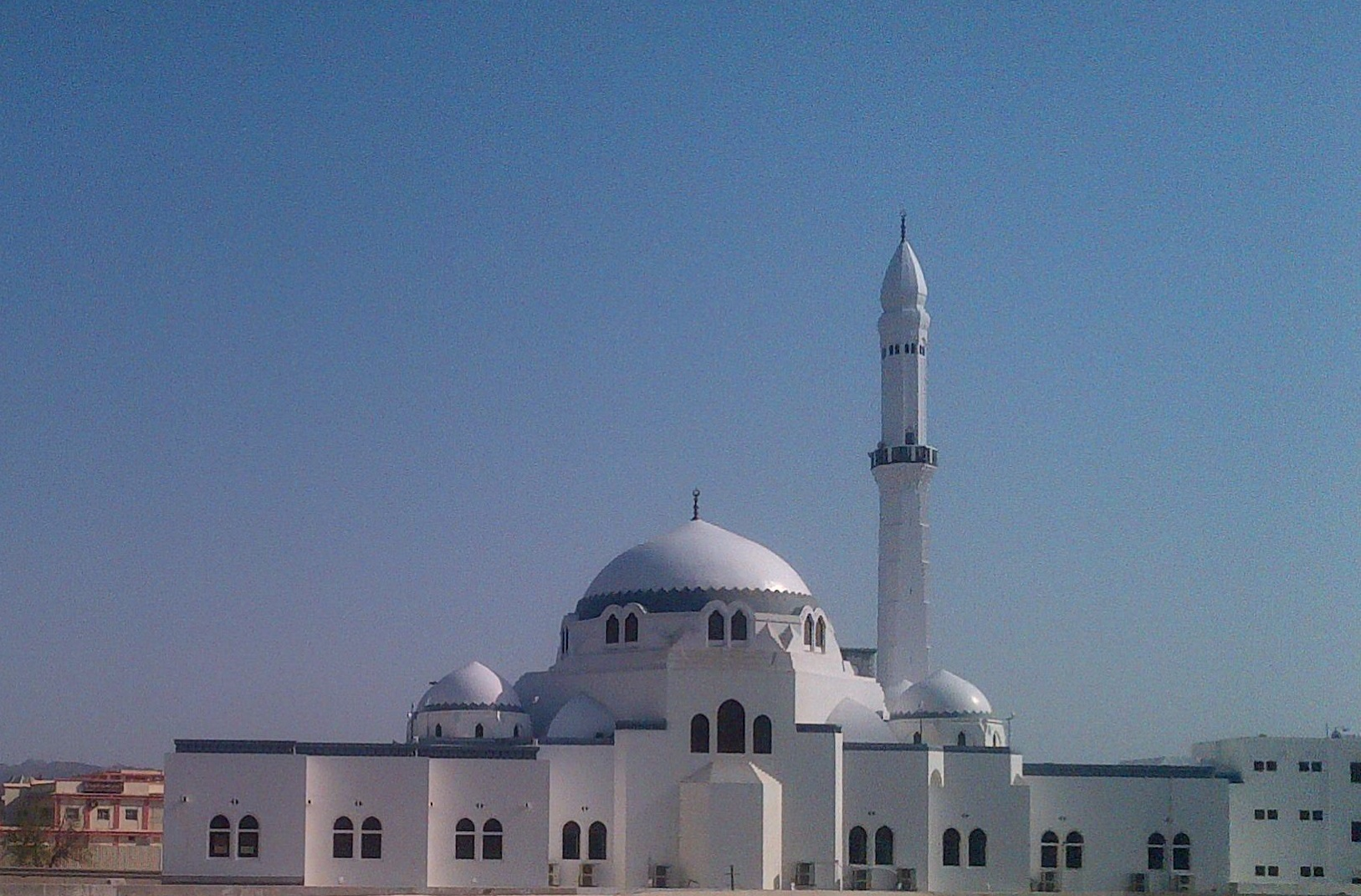

- Location of the mosque in Saudi Arabia

Religion
- Affiliation: Islam

Location
- Location: Medina, Hejaz
- Country: Saudi Arabia
- Interactive map of Al Jum'ah Mosque
- Coordinates: 24°26′43.8″N 39°36′55.2″E

Architecture
- Groundbreaking: 1 AH (622/623 CE)

Specifications
- Capacity: 650 worshippers
- Dome: 5
- Minaret: 1

Al Jum'ah Mosque (Arabic: مَسْجِد ٱلْجُمُعَة, romanized: Masjid Al-Jumuʿah, "Mosque of the Friday") is a mosque in Medina, in the Hejazi region of Saudi Arabia. Also known as Masjid Banī Sālim (مَسْجِد بَنِي سَالِم), Masjid Al-Wādī (مَسْجِد ٱلْوَادِي), Masjid Al-Qubayb (مَسْجِد ٱلْقُبَيْب), and Masjid ʿĀtikah (مَسْجِد عَاتِكَة), it is said by the locals to be where the Islamic prophet Muhammad and his companions performed Salatul-Jumu'ah for the first time, during their hijrah (migration) from Mecca to Medina.

== Location ==
It is located near Wadi Ranuna', 900 metres (3,000 feet) north of Quba Mosque, and 6 km (3.7 miles) south of Al-Masjid an-Nabawi.

== History ==
During the Hijrah from Mecca to Medina, on Monday the 12th of Rabi' al-Awwal, Year 1 of the Hijri calendar, Muhammad and other Muhajirun (emigrants from Mecca to Medina) stopped by Quba for four days. On the morning of Friday, they resumed the route to Medina, stopped in the region of Wadi Ranuna', and fulfilled the prayer of Jumu'ah prayer. This region is called Jumuʿah today.

=== Foundation ===
It was initially built by rocks, then demolished and renovated several times. Before renovation, the mosque had a dome of red bricks, a length of 8 metres (26 feet), width of 4.5 metres (15 feet), and height o 5.5 metres (18 feet). There was a yard with a length of 8 metres (26 feet), and width of 6 metres (20 feet), attached to the eastern part. The renovation in 1988 by the Ministry of Awqaf of the Saudi government, led by King Fahd bin Abdul Aziz, was accompanied by the demolition of the old part and the building of a new part, which includes a residence for an imam and a muezzin, a library, Madrasat Tahfiz al-Qurʾan, a female prayer room, and a bathroom. In 1991, the mosque was reopened to the public with a capacity of 650 pilgrims, a main dome, and four small domes.

=== Timeline of renovation ===
- The second renovation was conducted by the Umayyad Caliph Umar II.
- The third renovation was conducted during the time of Abbasid Caliphate between 734 and 748.
- The fourth renovation was conducted by Shamsuddin Qawan during the 14th century.
- Renovation during Ottoman rule was led by the Sultan Bayazid.
- Renovation in the middle of the 19th century was led by Sayyid Hasan Ash-Sharbatli.

== See also ==
- Holiest sites in Islam
- Islam in Saudi Arabia
- List of mosques in Saudi Arabia
- List of mosques in Medina
