= Wadi al-Qura =

Valley north of Medina in Saudi Arabia

Wadi al-Qura (Arabic: وادي القرى, lit. 'Valley of Villages') is a wadi north of Medina in Saudi Arabia, mentioned in early Islamic sources. It was located on the main trade road between the Hejaz and Syria.

The wadi is tentatively identified with the modern Wadi al-'Ula region. The meaning of the name, "Valley of Villages", suggests the area contained several villages. The 10th-century geographer Istakhri noted it was one of the most populous and agriculturally productive areas of Arabia. The 9th-century historian Ibn al-Kalbi described it as highly fertile and dotted with villages throughout.

Verses of Umayyad poetry say that monks and monasticism existed in Wadi al-Qura. Irfan Shahîd suggests that the rise of monasticism in the area may have been linked to the influence of the Christian tribe Banu Udhra.

The wadi is referenced in many early Islamic texts. Several military expeditions took place there during the time of the Islamic Prophet Muhammad. These include:

- the Expedition of Zaid ibn Haritha (Wadi al-Qura), where Muhammad sent Zayd ibn Haritha to survey the area and to monitor the movements of the enemies of Muhammad,
- the Second Expedition of Wadi al-Qura which Muhammad ordered to raid the inhabitants of Wadi al-Qura for revenge, because a number of Muslims were killed when they tried to raid the inhabitants previously, but failed.
- During the end of Muhammad's era the Third Expedition of Wadi al Qura was ordered, with the purpose of attacking the Jews of Wadi al-Qura to conquer their land

Recent discoveries of Geonic responsa have shown that there was a Jewish presence in Wadi al-Qura as late as the 11th century CE, and that they maintained correspondence with Rabbi Sherira Gaon and Rabbi Hai Gaon.

== See also ==
- List of expeditions of Muhammad

== Sources ==
- Shahid, Irfan (2002). Byzantium and the Arabs in the Sixth Century, Volume 2, Part 1, Toponymy, Monuments, Historical Geography, and Frontier Studies. Dumbarton Oaks.
