= Banu Mudlij =

The Banu Mudlij were a tribe from around the time of the Islamic prophet Muhammad. They were involved in a conflict with him during the Invasion of Dul Ashir and resided around al-Usharayh area of Saudi Arabia.

== See also ==
- List of expeditions of Muhammad
- Alqama ibn Mujazziz al-Mudliji
