= Third Expedition of Wadi al Qura =

628 military campaign in the early Muslim period

- Part of Muhammad's campaigns
Date	May 628 AD, 2nd month of 7 AH
Location	Wadi al-Qura, Medina, Arabia
Result	Muslim victory; Jews surrender to the Muslims

Belligerents
Muslims of Medina	Jews of al-Qura

Commanders and leaders
Muhammad; Saʽd ibn ʽUbadah; Al-Hubab ibn al-Mundhir; Abbad ibn Bishr; Sahl ibn Hunayf; Ali ibn Abi Talib; Khalid ibn al-Walid; Zubayr ibn al-Awwam	Unknown

Strength
Unknown	(Unknown)

Casualties and losses
1 killed	Nearly entire tribe killed

Third Expedition of Wadi al Qura, also known as the Campaign of Wadi al Qura or Ghazwah of Wadi al Qura took place in June 628 AD, 2nd month of 7AH, of the Islamic calendar.

The operation was successful and the siege lasted 2 days before the Jews surrendered and accepted the terms offered by Islamic prophet Muhammad, similar to what the Jews had done in the Battle of Khaybar and in the Conquest of Fidak.

This was the 3rd Expedition in Wadi al-Qura, the 1st Expedition and 2nd Expedition in Wadi al Qura took place one year earlier.

== Siege of Wadi al Qura ==
After the Battle of Khaybar and Conquest of Fidak, Muhammad made a fresh move towards Wadi Al-Qura, another Jewish colony in Arabia. He mobilized his forces and divided them into three regiments with four banners entrusted to Sa‘d bin ‘Ubada, Al-Hubab bin Mundhir, ‘Abbad bin Bishr and Sahl bin Haneef. Before the fighting, he invited the Jews to embrace Islam, an offer they ignored.

The first of their champions (best fighters) came out and was slain by Zubayr ibn al-Awwam, the second of their champions came out and was slain also, the third was slain by Ali. In this way 11 of the Jews were killed one after another and with each one newly killed, a fresh call was extended inviting those people to profess Islam. Fighting went on ceaselessly and resulted in full surrender of the Jews. The Jews resisted for one or two days, then they surrendered on similar terms like the Jews of Khaybar and Fadak.

After the surrender of the Jews at Wadi al-Qura, Muhammad established his full authority on all the Jewish tribes of Medina.

== Primary sources ==
The event is mentioned in the Sunni hadith collection Al-Muwatta (compiled by Imam Malik, founder of the Maliki school of thought), it states:

Yahya related to me from Malik from Thawr ibn Zayd ad-Dili from Abu'l-Ghayth Salim, the mawla of ibn Muti that Abu Hurayra said, "We went out with the Messenger of God, may God bless him and grant him peace, in the year of Khaybar. We did not capture any gold or silver except for personal effects, clothes, and baggage. Rifaa ibn Zayd presented a black slave boy to the Messenger of God, may God bless him and grant him peace, whose name was Midam. The Messenger of God, may God bless him and grant him peace, made for Wadi'l-Qura, and when he arrived there, Midam was unsaddling the camel of the Messenger of God, may God bless him and grant him peace, when a stray arrow struck and killed him. The people said, 'Good luck to him! The Garden!' The Messenger of God said, 'No! By He in whose hand my self is! The cloak which he took from the spoils on the Day of Khaybar before they were distributed will blaze with fire on him.' When the people heard that, a man brought a sandal-strap or two sandal-straps to the Messenger of God, may God bless him and grant him peace. The Messenger of God, may God bless him and grant him peace, said, 'A sandal-strap or two sandal-straps of fire!' " Al-Muwatta, 21 13.25

== See also ==
- List of expeditions of Muhammad
- Military career of Muhammad
- Battle of Khaybar
- Muslim–Quraysh War
