= Dihyah al-Kalbi =

Messenger for Mohammed

Dihyah bin Khalifah al-Kalbi
- دِحْيَة بْن خَلِيفَة ٱلْكَلْبِيّ
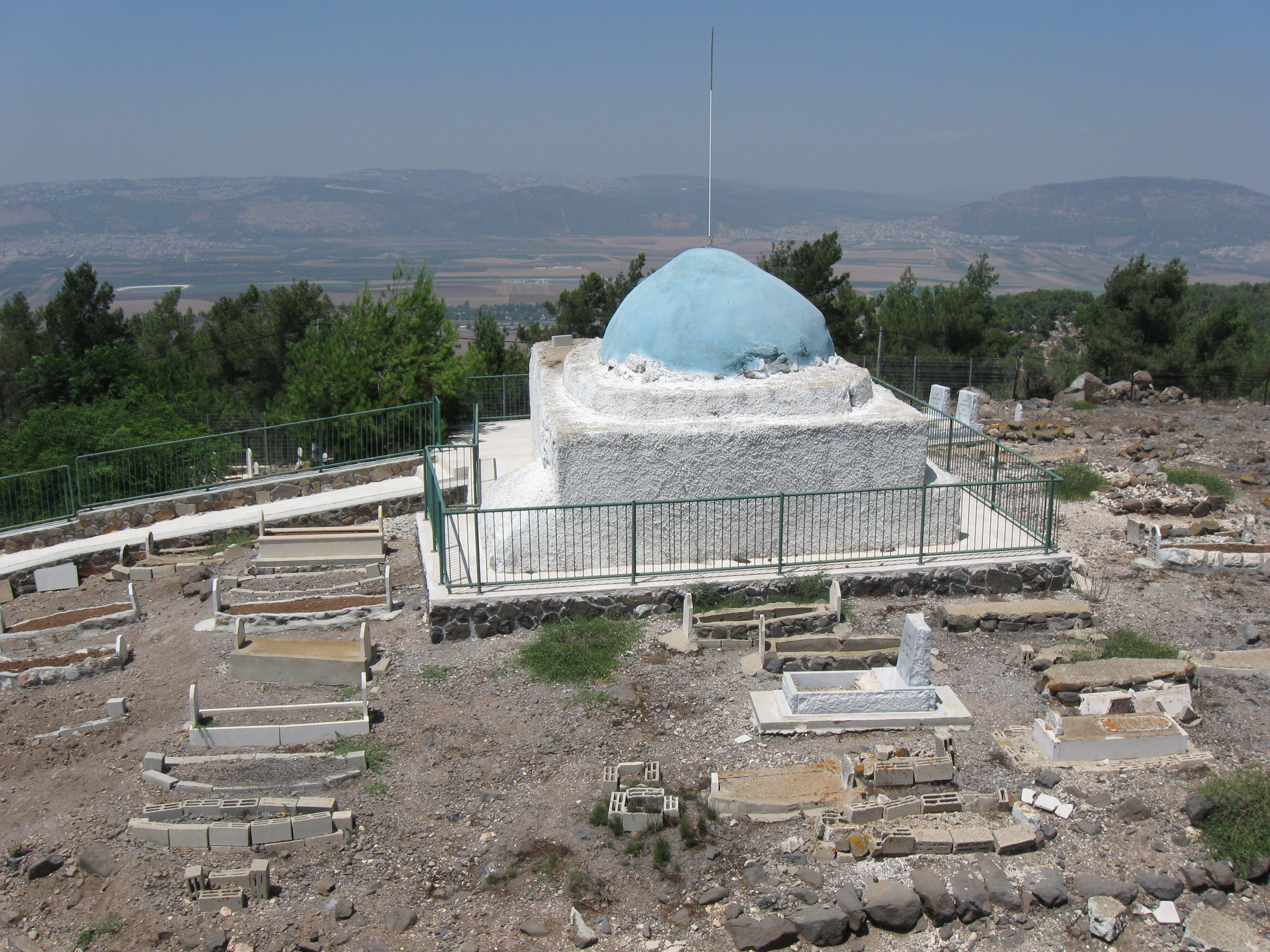
- Maqam of Nabi Dahi, dedicated to Dihyah al-Kalbi at Givat HaMoreh

Dihya ibn Khalifa al-Kalbi (Arabic: دِحْيَة بْن خَلِيفَة ٱلْكَلْبِيّ, Diḥya al-Kalbī), sometimes spelled Dahyah, was the envoy who delivered the Islamic prophet Muhammad's message to the Byzantine Emperor Heraclius.

According to Muhammad's wife 'Aisha, he saw Jibril twice “in the form that he was created” and on other occasions as a man resembling Dihya ibn Khalifa al-Kalbi, an extraordinarily handsome disciple of Muhammad.

Two similar narrations have been recorded through Abu Uthman in Sahih al-Bukhari that reports an incident witnessed by Muhammad's wife Umm Salama:

A hadith attributed to Abu 'Uthman reports:

I was informed that Gabriel came to the Prophet (S.A.W.) while Umm Salama was with him. Gabriel started talking (to the Prophet). Then the Prophet asked Umm Salama, "Who is this?" She replied, "He is Dihya (al-Kalbi)." When Gabriel had left, Umm Salama said, "By Allah, I did not take him for anybody other than him (i.e. Dihya) till I heard the sermon of the Prophet wherein he informed about the news of Gabriel." The sub narrator asked Abu 'Uthman: From whom have you heard that? Abu 'Uthman said: From 'Usama ibn Zayd

A hadith attributed to Abu 'Uthman reports:

I got the news that Gabriel came to the Prophet while Umm Salama was present. Gabriel started talking to the Prophet and then left. The Prophet said to Umm Salama, "(Do you know) who it was?" (or a similar question). She said, "It was Dihya (a handsome person amongst the companions of the Prophet)." Later on, Um Salama said, "By Allah! I thought he was none but Dihya, till I heard the Prophet talking about Gabriel in his sermon." (The Sub-narrator asked Abu 'Uthman, "From where have you heard this narration?" He replied, "From 'Usama ibn Zayd.")

== Expedition of Zaid ibn Harithah (Hisma) ==
He was attacked during the Expedition of Zayd ibn Harithah (Hisma) Dihya approached the Banu Dubayb (a tribe that converted to Islam and had good relations with Muslims) for help. When the news reached Muhammad, he immediately dispatched Zayd ibn Harithah with 500 men to punish them. The Muslim army fought with Banu Judham, killed several of them (inflicting heavy casualties), including their chief, Al-Hunayd ibn Arid and his son, and captured 1000 camels, 5000 of their cattle, and 100 women and boys. The chief of the Banu Judham who had embraced Islam appealed to Muhammad to release his fellow tribesmen, and Muhammad released them.

== Death ==
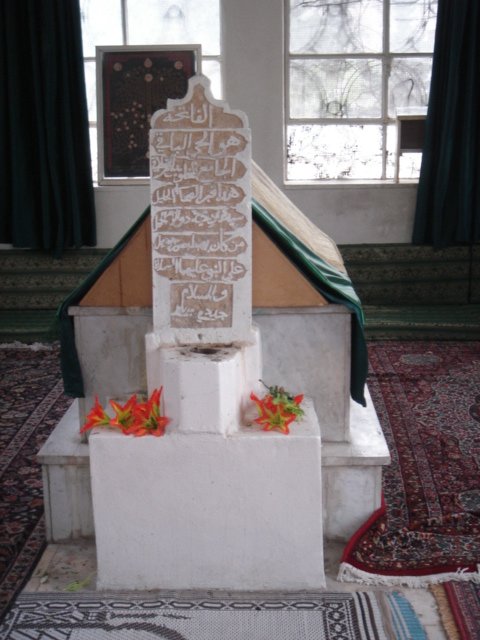
Kalbi's shrine in Mezzeh, Damascus

Kalbi died in Mezzeh, Damascus and was buried there.

== See also ==
- List of battles of Muhammad
