= Second Expedition of Wadi al-Qura =

Date	January 628 AD, 10th month 6 AH
Location	Wadi al-Qura
Result	Successful operation, 30 horsemen including enemy commander, killed

Commanders and leaders
Zayd ibn Harithah	Unknown

Strength
Large platoon	Unknown

Casualties and losses
Unknown	30 horsemen killed Large amount captured

Second Expedition of Wadi al-Qura took place in January, 628AD, 9th month of 6AH of the Islamic calendar The raid was carried out by Zayd ibn Harithah or Abu Bakr, as a revenge for an ambush carried out by Banu Fazara against a party of 12 scouts led by Zayd ibn Harithah to monitor the surroundings of Medina against attacks from hostile tribes. The party was attacked as they slept at night, nine Muslims were killed, Zayd ibn Harithah himself escaped after suffering several wounds.

== Background ==
Zaid bin Harith went on a trading expedition towards Syria and with him was the merchandise for the Companions of Muhammed. While he was near Wadi’l Qura he met a party from the Tribe of Fazara of Banu Badr. They attacked him and his companions and snatched all that was with them (of merchandise).

Some of his fellows were killed and he himself was carried wounded from the field. Zaid vowed that he would not wash his head for ritual purity (i.e. he vowed to abstain from sexual intercourse) until he fought the people of Fazara.

== Revenge attack ==
After his recovery from the injury and following the morning prayer, the detachment was given orders to raid the enemy. He attacked them at Wadi al-Qura and inflicted heavy casualties on them. Some of them were killed and others captured. In all 30 horsemen were killed, including the leader who was an old woman named Umm Qirfa.

He took Umm Qirfa, the aunt of Uyeina back to Muhammad. Zayd also took Umm Qirfa's daughter as a captive and was given to Muhammad, who gave her to the Meccans in exchange for Muslim prisoners (according to the Sahih Muslim hadith collection).

== Islamic primary sources ==
The event is mentioned in detail in the Sunni hadith collection, Sahih Muslim. It mentions that Umm Qirfa's daughter was exchanged for Muslim prisoners, who were held in Mecca.

It has been narrated on the authority of Salama (b. al-Akwa') who said: We fought against the Fazara and Abu Bakr was the commander over us. He had been appointed by the Messenger of Allah (may peace be upon him). When we were only at an hour's distance from the water of the enemy, Abu Bakr ordered us to attack. We made a halt during the last part of the night tor rest and then we attacked from all sides and reached their watering-place where a battle was fought. Some of the enemies were killed and some were taken prisoners. I saw a group of persons that consisted of women and children. I was afraid lest they should reach the mountain before me, so I shot an arrow between them and the mountain. When they saw the arrow, they stopped. So I brought them, driving them along. Among them was a woman from Banu Fazara. She was wearing a leather coat. With her was her daughter who was one of the prettiest girls in Arabia. I drove them along until I brought them to Abu Bakr who bestowed that girl upon me as a prize. So we arrived in Medina. I had not yet disrobed her when the Messenger of Allah (may peace be upon him) met me in the street and said: Give me that girl, O Salama. I said: Messenger of Allah, she has fascinated me. I had not yet disrobed her. When on the next day. the Messenger of Allah (may peace be upon him) again met me in the street, he said: O Salama, give me that girl, may God bless your father. I said: She is for you. Messenger of Allah! By Allah. I have not yet disrobed her. The Messenger of Allah (may peace be upon him) sent her to the people of Mecca, and surrendered her as ransom for a number of Muslims who had been kept as prisoners at Mecca. Sahih Muslim, 19:4345

== See also ==
- Military career of Muhammad
- List of expeditions of Muhammad
