= Wadi al-'Ula =

Wadi Al-'Ula وادي العلا
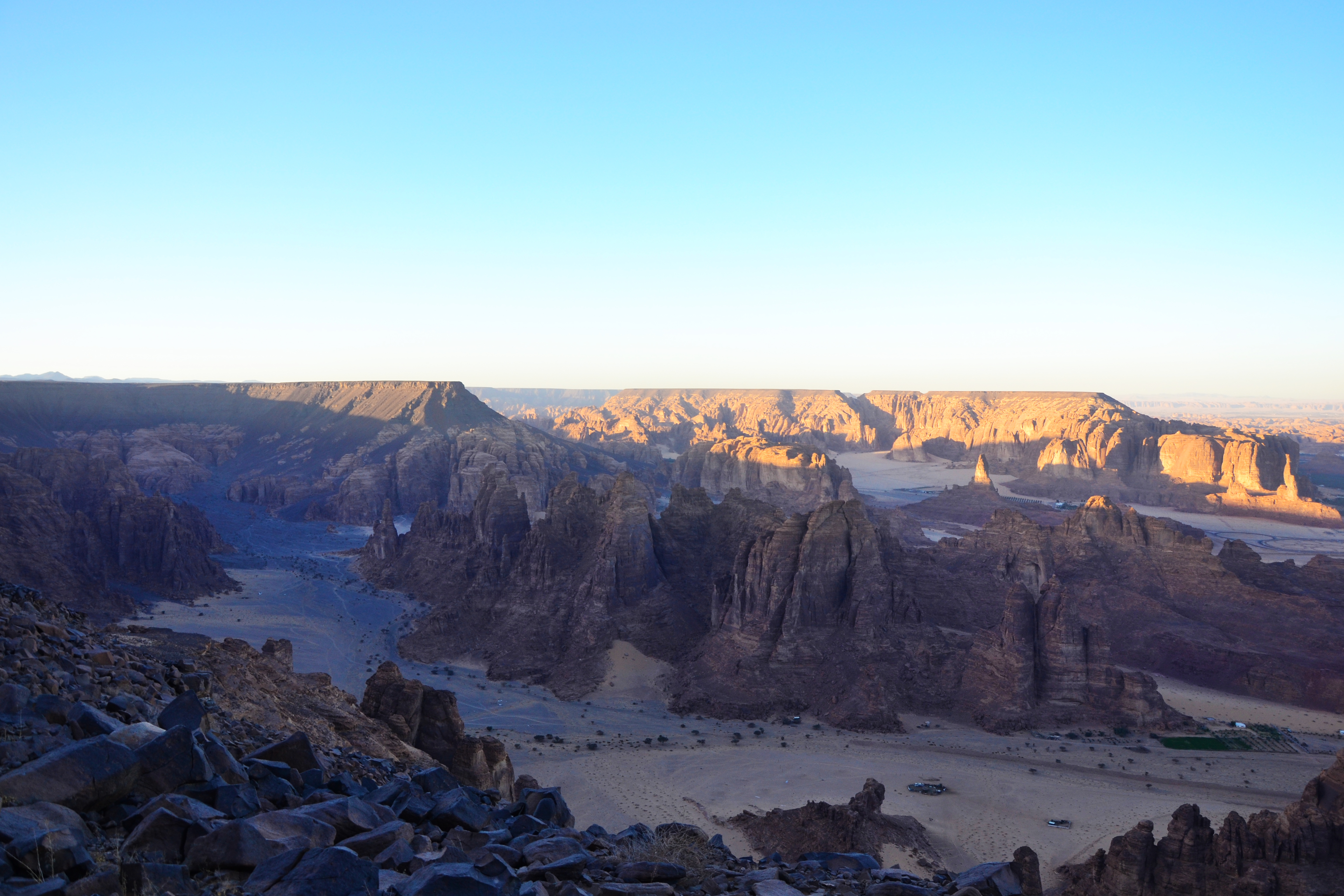
- Wadi Al-`Ula at sunset.

- Location within Saudi Arabia
- Coordinates: 26°37′N 37°55′E
- Country: Saudi Arabia
- Region: Al Madinah

Wadi al-'Ula is a wadi in western Saudi Arabia. It is a tributary of the Wadi Jizal. The main town is Al-'Ula. The name means “valley of villages”.

== History ==
About 4 km from the modern town of Al-'Ula are a set of ruins, These ruins here are the remnant of a former Capital of the Dedanites, which was flourishing from 800 BCE to the 1st century. At this time the wadi was a stop on the spice routes. Agriculture and shepherding were the main economic staples of the wadi's population at this time.

There was also a pilgrimage site in the hills nearby, and the walls of the wadi are covered with ancient petroglyphs.

The city ceased in about 100AD with the control of the trade routes by the Nabataeans to the east and incursions by the Romans.

The wadi has been tentatively identified with Wadi al-Qura of early Islamic times.

== Gallery ==
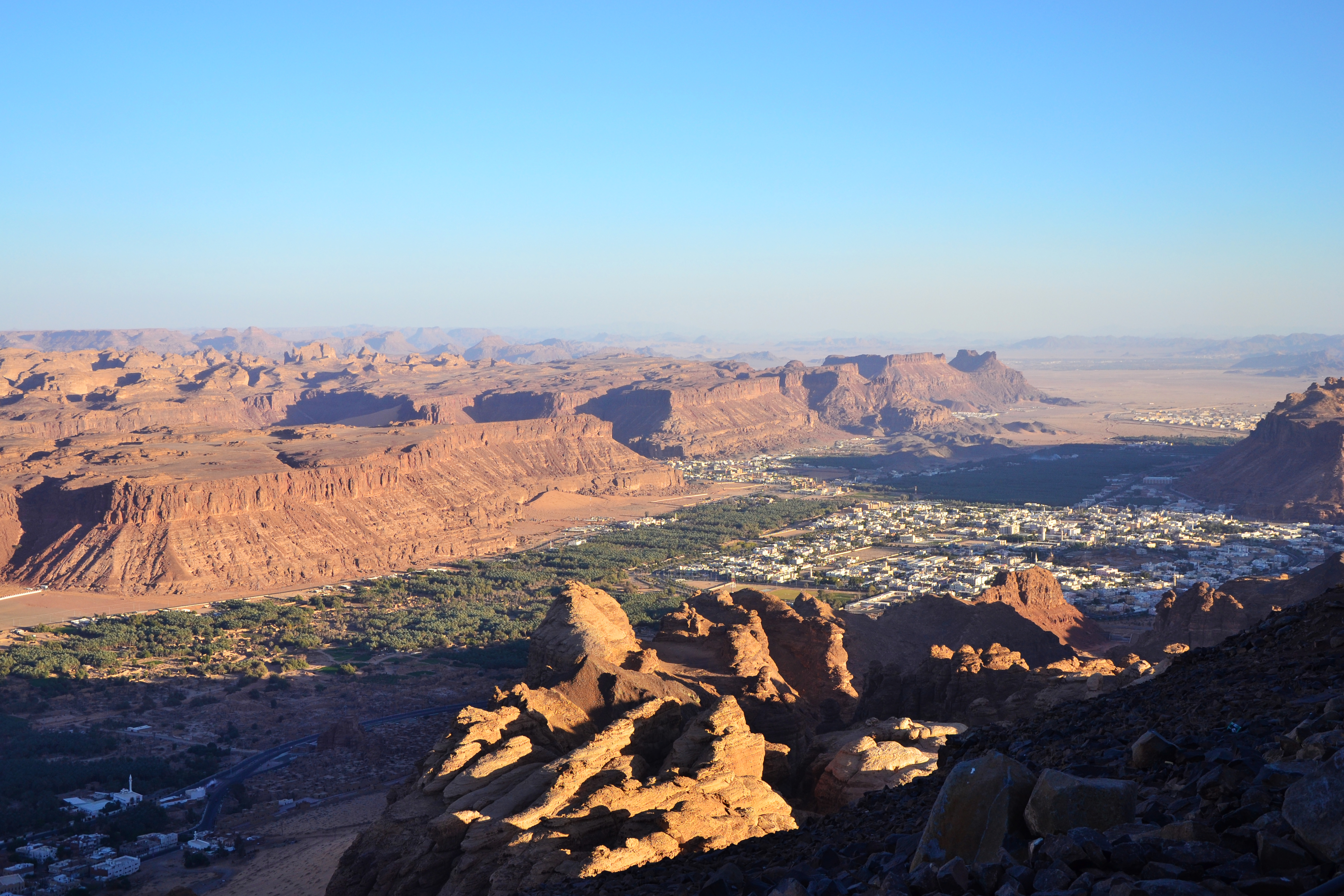

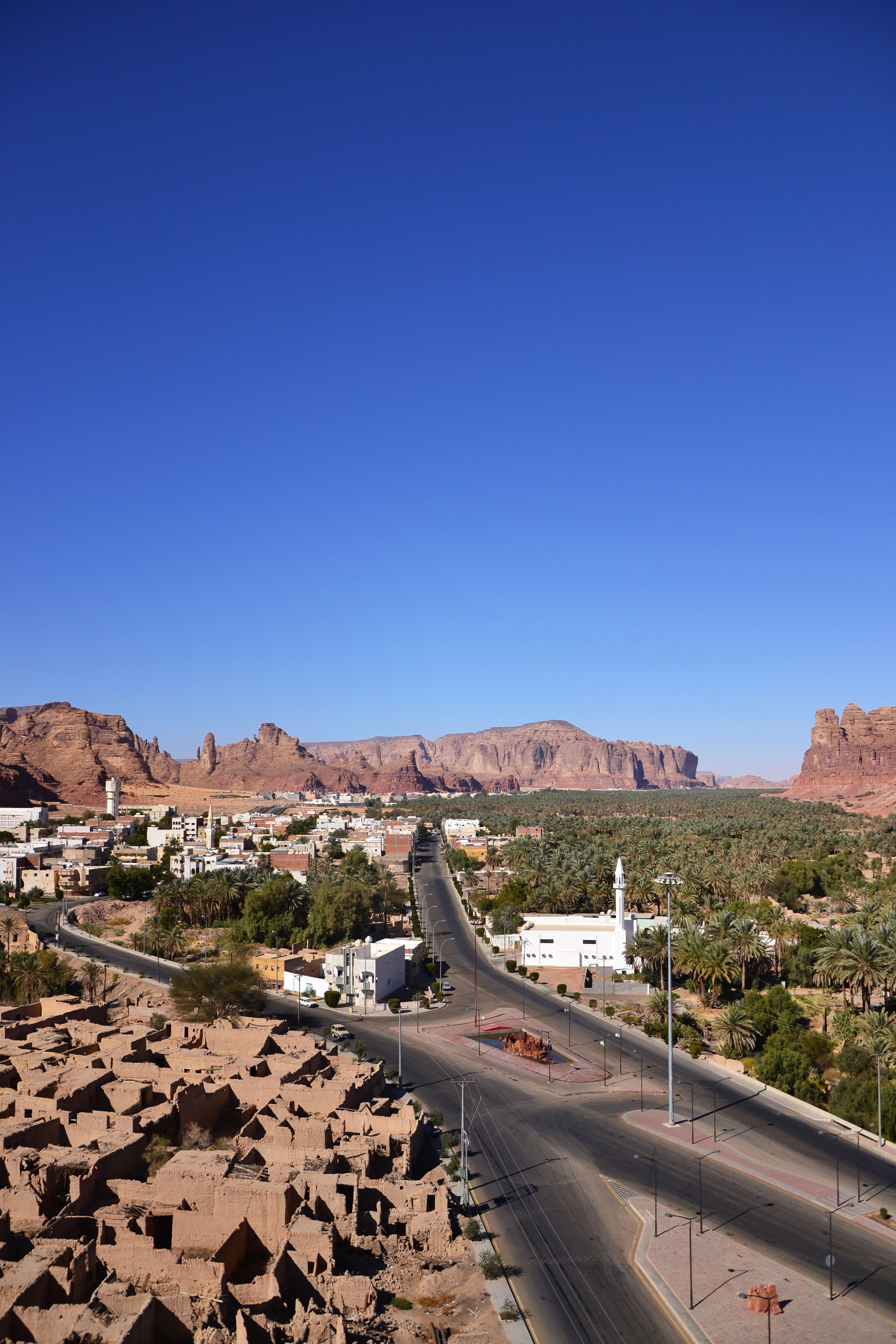
Wadi Al Ula 2012

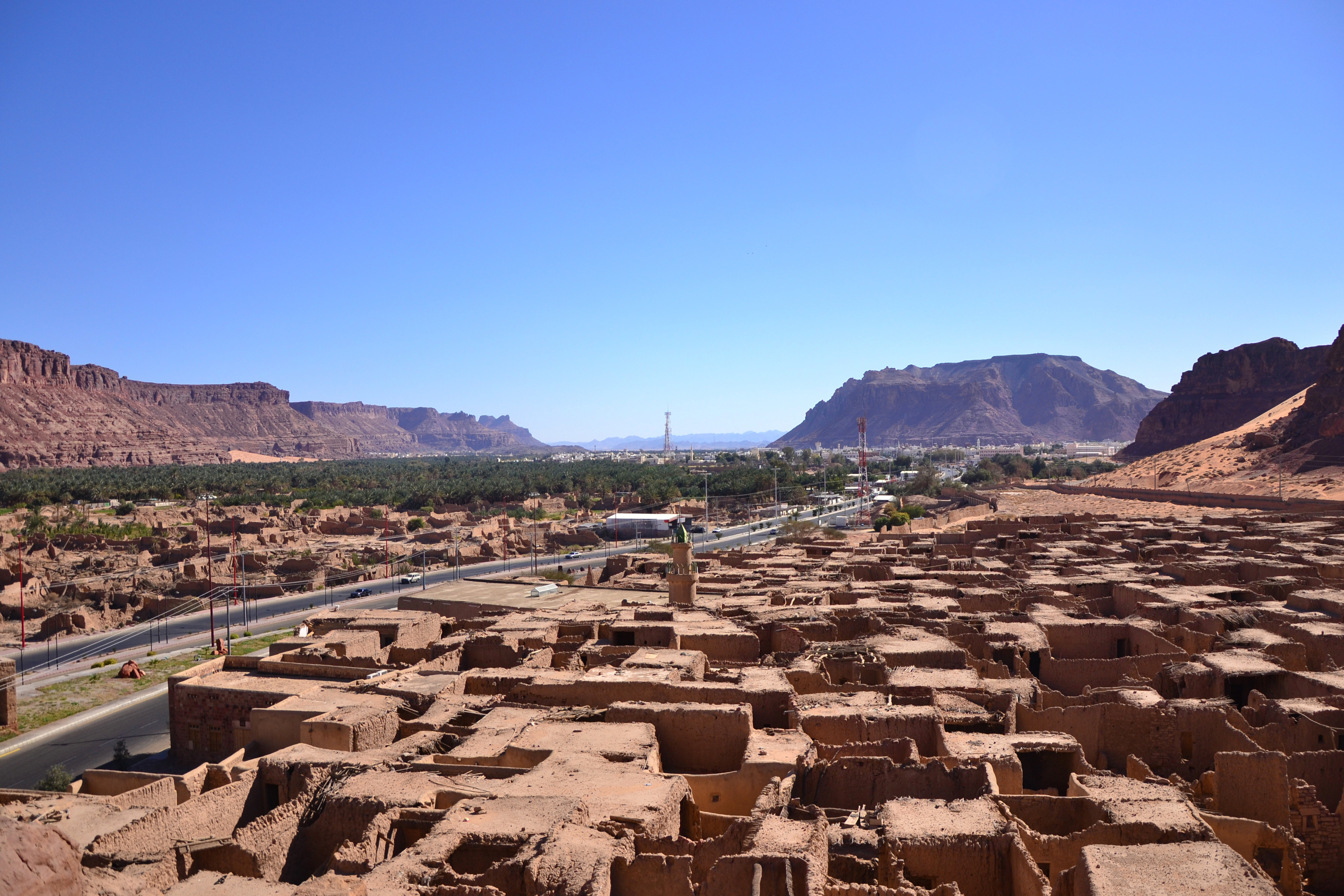
Old Al-Ula

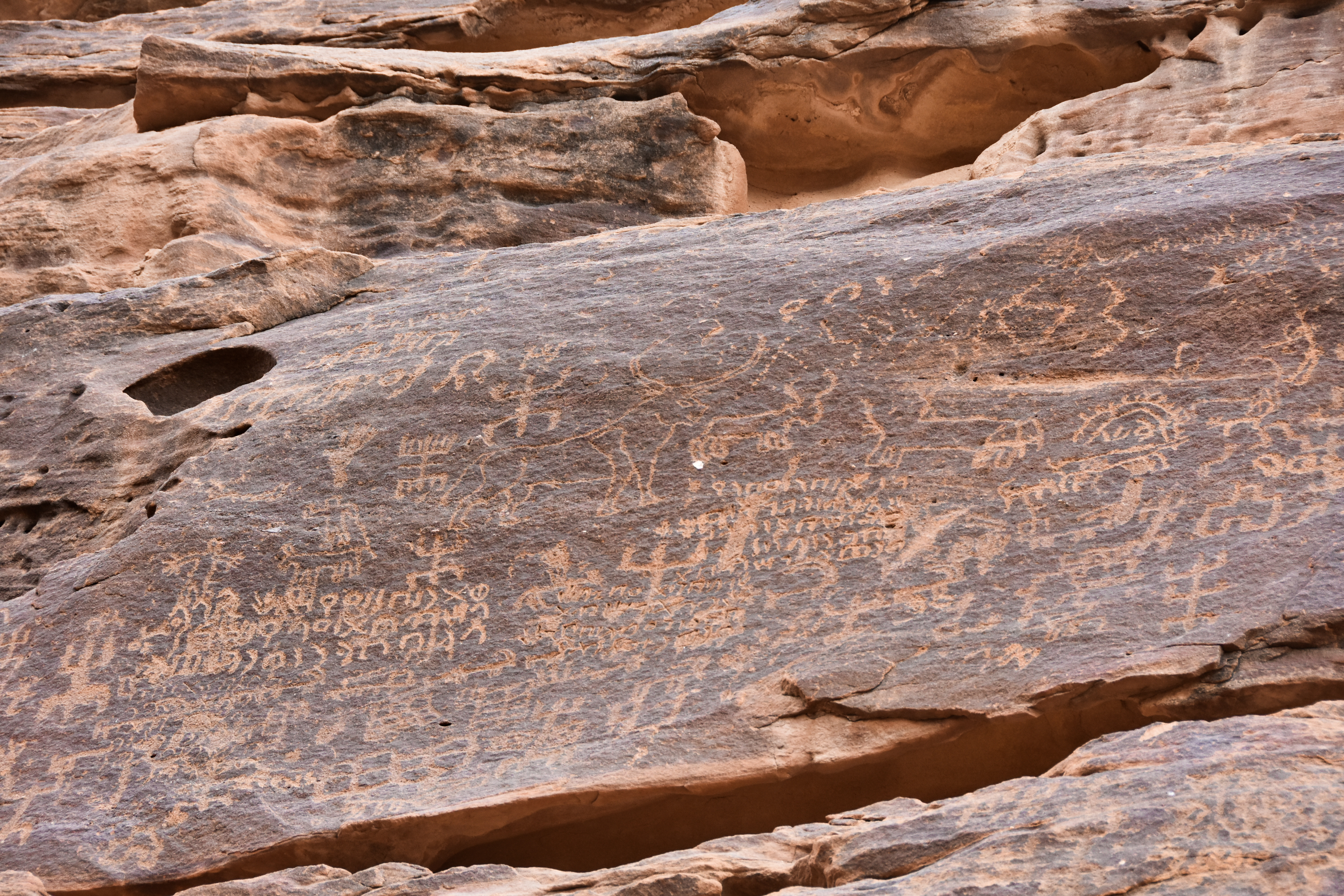
Petroglyphs of Jabal Ikmah

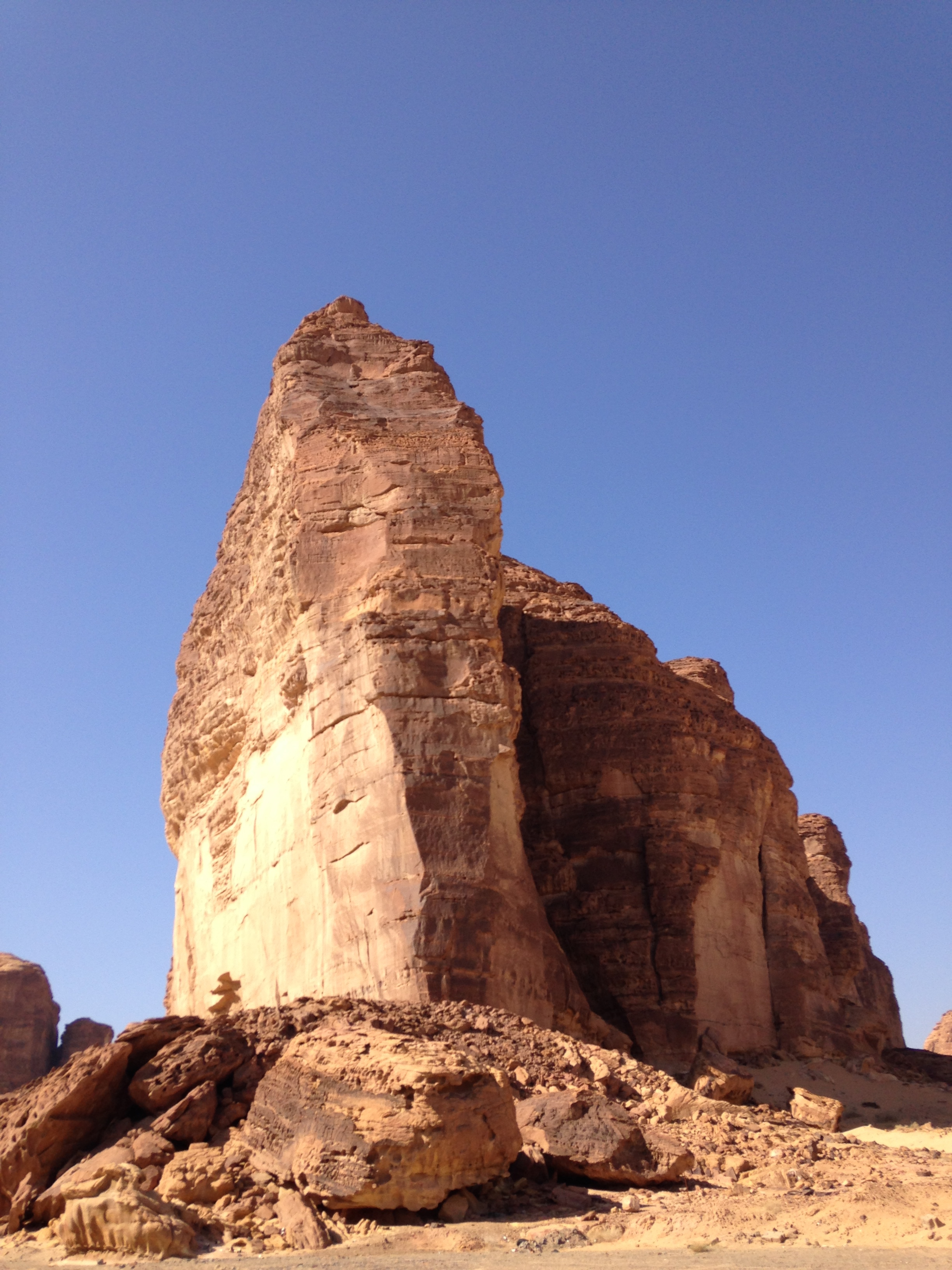
Rock formation

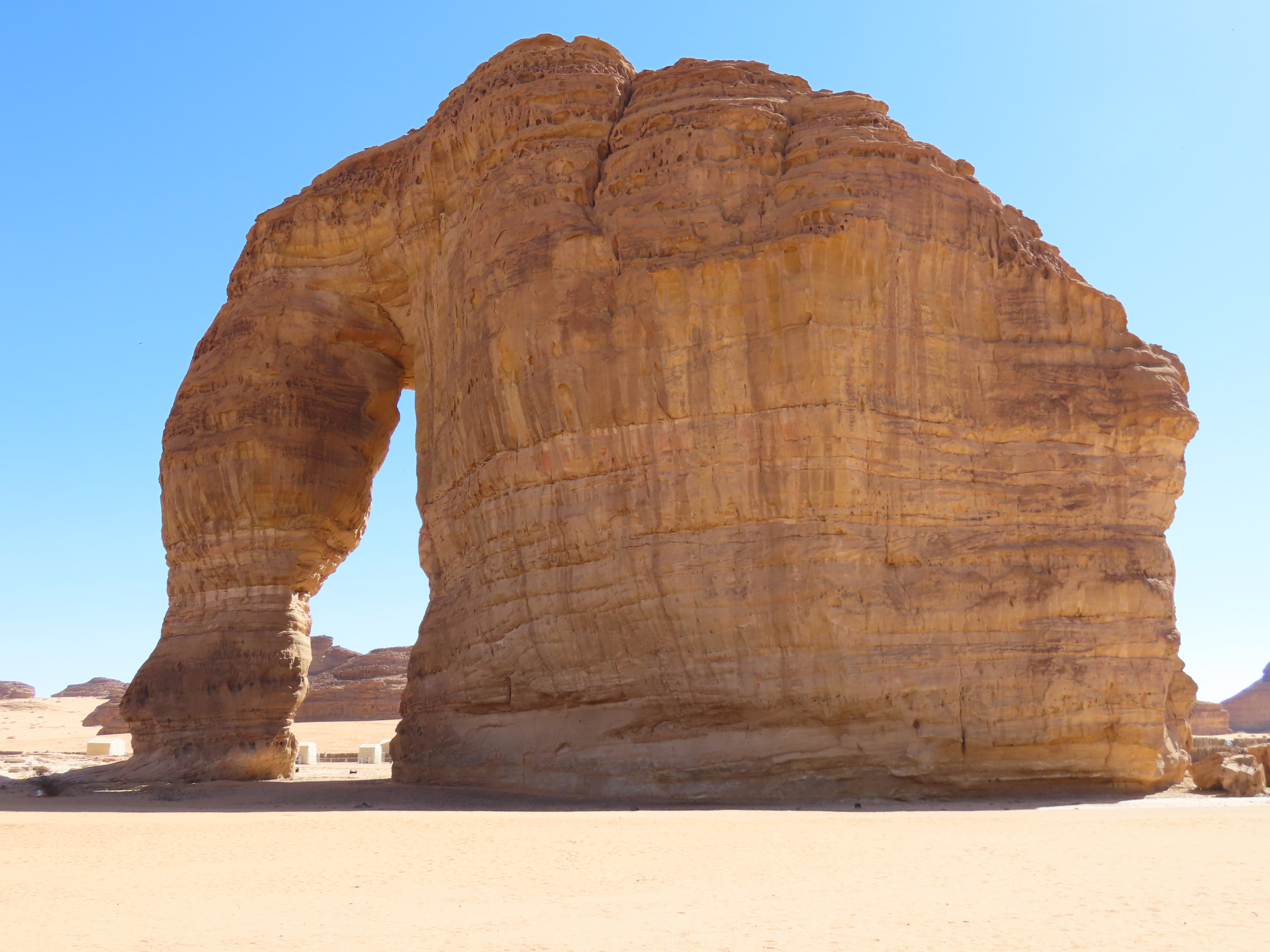
Elephant rock Al-'Ula
