= Patrol of Zul Al-Ushairah =

623 event in early Islamic history

The Patrol of Dhu Al-Ushairah occurred in the year 2 A.H. of the Islamic calendar between the months of Jumādi al-Ūlā and Jumādi al-Ākhirah (November–December, 623 CE). This was the 6th caravan expedition and the 3rd ‘Ghazwah’ (in which Prophet Muḥammad himself was the commander) occurring about 2 months after the Invasion of Buwāṭ.

== Location ==
Dhil ‘Ushayrah (ذي العشيرة) is located about 9 manzils (100 miles) away from the valley of Yanbu‘. Exact location on present Google map is still not known. Some Arab team is working to find out the location where Ghazwa e Ushayrah took place.

== Description ==
When Prophet Muḥammad received intelligence that a Meccan caravan was heading towards Syria led by Abū Sufyān ibn Ḥarb, he directed about 150-200 Muslim volunteers in order to intercept it.

They had 30 camels that they rode upon by turns. They made their way through the territory of the Banū Dīnār, then past Fayfā’ al-Khabār or Khayyār and made camp beneath a tree in the Ibn Azhar valley at a place called Dhāt al-Sāq. Muhammad said his prayers there where a mosque was built.

The army then moved on, leaving al-Khalā'iq to their left and traversed the 'Abdullah defile. From there Prophet Muhammad kept left; coming down the Yalyal trail where it joined al-Ḍabū'ah. He drank of the well at al-Ḍabū'ah and then traversed the plain of Malal until he met the road at Ṣukhayrāt al-Yamām and then went on along it till he reached al-’Ushayrah, in the valley of Yanbu‘. They expected to ambush that caravan there.

Prophet Muḥammad knew when this caravan had departed from Mecca and encamped there for about a month for this caravan to arrive at the ambush point. But the Meccan caravan had already passed some days before when the Muslims arrived.

This was the same caravan led by Abū Sufyān that Prophet Muhammad set out to intercept on its return from Syria two months after Dhi’l ‘Ushayrah invasion, and was the direct reason for the break out of the Battle of Badr.

Muhammad left Abu Salamah ibn 'Abd al-Asad in charge of Medina while he was away.

His banner was carried by Ḥamzah ibn ‘Abdu’l-Muṭṭalib.

== Result ==
Prophet Muhammad remained in al-‘Ushayrah for Jumādā al-Ūlā and some nights of Jumādā al-Ākhirah. In the process of this campaign, Prophet Muhammad entered into an alliance by contracting a non-aggression pact with Banū Madlij/Mudlij, a tribe inhabiting the vicinity of al-‘Ushayrah. The negotiation was done easily because their ally Banū Ḍamrah had already made a peace agreement with the Muslims. Muhammad also concluded another treaty that was made previously with Banū Ḍamrah during the expedition of Waddān.

Muhammad then returned to Medina, without having engaged in battle.

== Prediction of ‘Alī’s Death ==
According to Ibn Ishaq, Muhammad prophesied the assassination of 'Alī ibn Abū Ṭālib during this expedition:

'Ammār ibn Yasar narrated that he and 'Alī ibn Abū Ṭālib were companions on the expedition to al-'Ushayra. 'Alī proposed that they visit some men of Banū Mudlij who were doing some work on a well and on the date palms. They watched them for a while until they were overcome by drowsiness. They fell asleep in the soft fine dust beneath some young date-palms. They were woken up by the Prophet stirring them with his foot. He addressed 'Alī `Abū Turāb` (father of mud) being soiled with earth. The Prophet then asked, 'Shall I tell you of the two most wretched creatures? They are Uḥaymir of Thamūd who slaughtered the camel of Ṣālih and the man who will strike you on this,' and he placed his hand on 'Alī's head, 'so that this will become soaked from it.' and he touched 'Alī's beard.

== See also ==
- List of expeditions of Muhammad
- Military career of Muhammad
- Muslim–Quraysh War
- Assassination of Ali
