= Al Kudr Invasion =

Event in early islamic history, 624 CE

Date	624 AD, AH 2
Location	Al Kudr
Result	Muslim victory; Banu Salim tribe members all flee; 500 camels of the Banu Saleem, taken by Muhammad as war booty

Belligerents
Muslims	Banu Salim

Commanders and leaders
Muhammad	None

Strength
200	Unknown

Casualties and losses
None	None; 500 camels captured

The expedition against the Banu Salim tribe, also known as the Al Kudr Invasion, occurred directly after the Battle of Badr in the year AH 2 of the Islamic calendar. The expedition was ordered by the Islamic prophet Muhammad after he received intelligence that the Banu Salim were planning to invade Madina.

This was Muhammad's first interaction with the people of Bahrain. He had received news that some tribes were amassing an army on march from Bahrain.

Muhammad responded by launching a pre-emptive strike against their base in Al Kudr, which was a watering place at the time. When the tribe heard of this, they fled. Muhammad captured 500 of their camels from the raid, and distributed them between his fighters. He also kept a fifth of the spoils as khums.

This event is mentioned in Ibn Hisham's biography of Muhammad and other historical books. Modern secondary sources which mention this include the award-winning book Ar-Raheeq Al-Makhtum (The Sealed Nectar).

== See also ==
- List of expeditions of Muhammad
