= Al-Mundhir ibn Sawa =

Ruler of Bahrain

Al-Mundhir ibn Sawa al-Tamimi (المنذر بن ساوى التميمي), also known as Abd Allah ibn Zayd ibn Abd Allah ibn Darim and Amil al-Bahrain, was an Arab tribal leader who led the Arabs of Bahrain within the Sasanian Empire. He accepted the request from Muhammad to convert to Islam in 628, and continued to rule until his death, which occurred shortly after the death of Muhammad.

== Letter of Muhammad ==
Eastern Arabia was conquered by the Sasanian Empire in 575, and it garrisoned soldiers in the Hajar Mountains. Al-Mundhir ibn Sawa, also known as Abd Allah ibn Zayd ibn Abd Allah ibn Darim, was the ruler of the Arabs of Bahrain and was appointed to that position by the Sasanians. He was a member of the Abd al-Qays tribe.

In 628, Muhammad sent envoys to multiple rulers, including Emperor Heraclius of the Byzantine Empire and Shahanshah Khosrow II of the Sasanian Empire. One of these envoys was also sent to Sawa and his tribe requesting that they convert to Islam. Sawa and his tribe agreed to convert to Islam.

Two versions of this letter exist; in the first version he specifically demanded that the Zoroastrians pay the jizya, but the second version demands that all non-Muslims who refuse to convert pay one dinar or the equivalent in Ma'afiri cloth (a cloth named after the village of Ma'afir near Taiz, Yemen). as jizya. Sawa retained his position as leader after converting to Islam and collected the jizya. He was known as Amil al-Bahrain after his conversion.

Sawa died shortly after the death of Muhammad. Al-Ala ibn al-Hadrami collected the jizya and ruled over the area from 633 to 635.

== Works cited ==
=== Books ===
- Axon, Anthony; Hewitt, Susan, eds. (2023). Bahrain 1975/76 - 2020. Brill Publishers. ISBN 9789004686328.
- Kozah, Mario; Abu-Husayn, Abdulrahim; Al-Murikhi, Saif; Thani, Haya, eds. (2014). The Syriac Writers of Qatar in the Seventh Century. Gorgias Press. ISBN 9781463236649.
- Macdonald, Ronald, ed. (2005). Towards World Constitutionalism: Issues in the Legal Ordering of the World Community. Brill Publishers. ISBN 9789004146129.
- Magnusson, Andrew (2023). Zoroastrians in Early Islamic History: Accommodation and Memory. Edinburgh University Press. ISBN 9781474489522.

=== Journals ===
- Elidrissi, Elbane; Alsaraireh, Suleiman; Aljahsh, Muhammad (2026). "The Genesis of Islamic Provincial Governance: Administrative Structures and Gubernatorial Appointments During the Prophetic Era (1-11 AH/622-632 CE)". Journal of Islamic Thought and Civilization. 16 (2). University of Management and Technology: 215–233. doi:10.32350/jitc.162.12. JSTOR jitc.162.12.

=== Web ===
- "MÜNZİR b. SÂVÂ" [MUNZIR b. SAWA] (in Turkish). İslâm Ansiklopedisi. Archived from the original on 9 November 2026.
