= Buwat =

Buwāṭ (بواط) is located near Mount Juhaynah in the neighborhood of Raḍwā. It was situated on the caravan route of the Quraysh merchants to Syria.

The Islamic prophet Muhammad launched a military campaign in this area known as the Patrol of Buwat.

== See also ==
- List of expeditions of Muhammad
