= Expedition of Zayd ibn Harithah (Al-Jumum) =

Expedition of Zayd ibn Harithah in Al-Jumum
Date	September 627 (4th month, AH 6)
Location	al Jumum
Result	Successful raid, much booty captured

Commanders and leaders
Zayd ibn Harithah	Unknown

Strength
Unknown	Unknown

Casualties and losses
0	Unknown number captured

Expedition of Zayd ibn Harithah in al-Jumum took place in September 627 (AH 6).

Zayd ibn Harithah was the freed slave and the adopted son of Muhammad. He led a platoon Muhammad sent to Al Jumum, the home of Banu Salim, in the same year. A group of non-Muslims were captured. A woman from Banu Muzaina was also captured, and she showed them the way to the enemy's camp, where the Muslims took captives and seized a large amount of booty. Later Muhammad freed the woman and married her to one of his followers.

== See also ==
- Military career of Muhammad
- List of expeditions of Muhammad
- Muslim–Quraysh War
