= Al-Qarada raid =

Raid in early Islamic history

Date	November, 624 CE, 3 A.H
Location	Nejd
Result	Muslim victory; Caravan leaders flee, Muslims capture 3 men (included the caravan guide); Muslims successfully capture 100,000 dirhams worth of booty (including gold and silver)

Belligerents
Muslims	Quraysh Carvans

Commanders and leaders
Zayd ibn Haritha	Unknown leader (POW)

Strength
100	Unknown

Casualties and losses
0	3 people captured

The Al-Qarada raid was an event in early Islamic history which took place in the month of Jumada al-Thani, in the year 3 A.H of the Islamic calendar, i.e. November 624.

The Meccans led by Safwan ibn Umayyah, who lived on trade, left in the summer for Syria for their seasonal trade business. After Muhammad received intelligence about the Caravan's route, Muhammad ordered Zayd ibn Haritha to go after the Caravan, and they successfully raided it and captured 100,000 dirhams worth of booty.

== Background ==
The Meccans were at loss on which trade route to take, since Muslims successfully attacked many of their caravans and intercepted their trade routes previously. Therefore, they tried to find another trade route for their caravan trade.

A group of Quraysh headed by Safwan ibn Umayyah took the risk of sending a caravan through a route far east of Medina, using a reliable guide. However, Muhammad got news of the plan, and sent Zayd ibn Harithah with 100 men.

== Raid ==
News of the trade route leaked out through Nu'am Bin Masud al Ashja'i, who was under the effect of alcohol. They caught up with the Caravan at a place called al-Qardah. He trailed the caravan and made a sudden attack on it.

The leader of the caravan fled without resistance, the caravan was carrying silver and goods. Zayd took the booty, and arrested their guide, they also captured two prisoners and took them back to Medina.

== Return to Medina ==
The booty (goods) captured was valued at 100,000 dirhams. The booty was distributed among the fighters, and Muhammad got one-fifth and gave it to the poor.

The guide in this raid, called Furat, became a prisoner of the Muslims. He later accepted Islam out of his own will, and was allowed to go free according to Ibn Hisham. The Sunan Abu Dawud hadith collection also mentions that a man called Furat was captured.

== Islamic primary sources about the event ==
=== Biographical literature ===
This event is mentioned in Ibn Hisham's biography of Muhammad, as well as other historical sources, including books by Persian Jurist, Tabari. Modern secondary sources which mention this, include the award-winning book, Ar-Raheeq Al-Makhtum (The Sealed Nectar). The event is also mentioned by the Muslim jurist Ibn Qayyim Al-Jawziyya in his biography of Muhammad, Zad al-Ma'ad.

=== Hadith ===
The Sahih Bukhari hadith collection mention that Muhammad sent some people on a sariya (military expedition) to Nejd. The hadith says:

The Prophet sent a Sariya towards Najd and I was in it, and our share from the booty amounted to twelve camels each, and we were given an additional camel each. So we returned with thirteen camels each.Sahih al-Bukhari, 5:59:627

Sahih Muslim, 19:4330, Sahih Muslim, 19:4331 and Sahih Muslim, 19:4332 also mention that Muhammad sent some Muslims on a Military expedition to Nejd. According to Tabari, in this raid, a man called Furat was captured, Sunan Abu Dawood, 14:2672 also mentions this.

== See also ==
- Military career of Muhammad
- List of expeditions of Muhammad
- Muslim–Quraysh War

== Notes ==
- Mubarakpuri, Saifur Rahman Al (2005), The sealed nectar: biography of the Noble Prophet, Darussalam Publications, ISBN 978-9960-899-55-8
