= Al-Abwa' =

Al-Abwa' ٱَلْأَبْوَاء
- Village
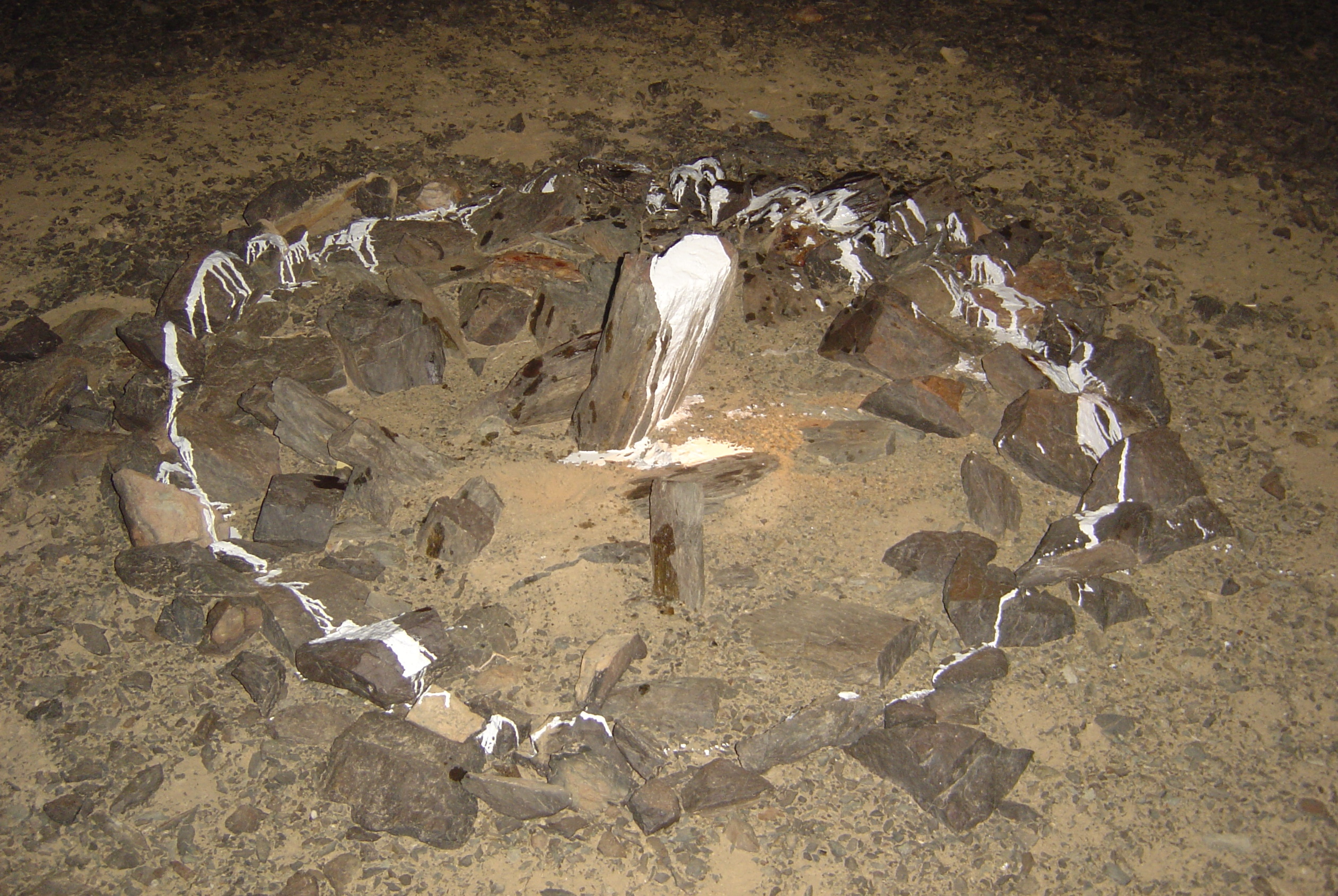
- A grave to the right of that of Muhammad's mother Aminah

- Location within Saudi Arabia Location within Middle East Location within Asia
- Country: Saudi Arabia
- Region: Makkah

Government
  - Provincial Governor: Khalid Al-Faisal

Population
  - Total: 7,000
- Time zone: UTC+3 (AST)

Al-Abwā' (Arabic: ٱَلْأَبْوَاء) is a Hejazi village between Mecca and Medina belonging to the area of Rabigh, on the western coast of Saudi Arabia. The Islamic Prophet Muhammad entered it before the Battle of Badr, in 2 Safar A.H.

== Significance in Islamic history ==
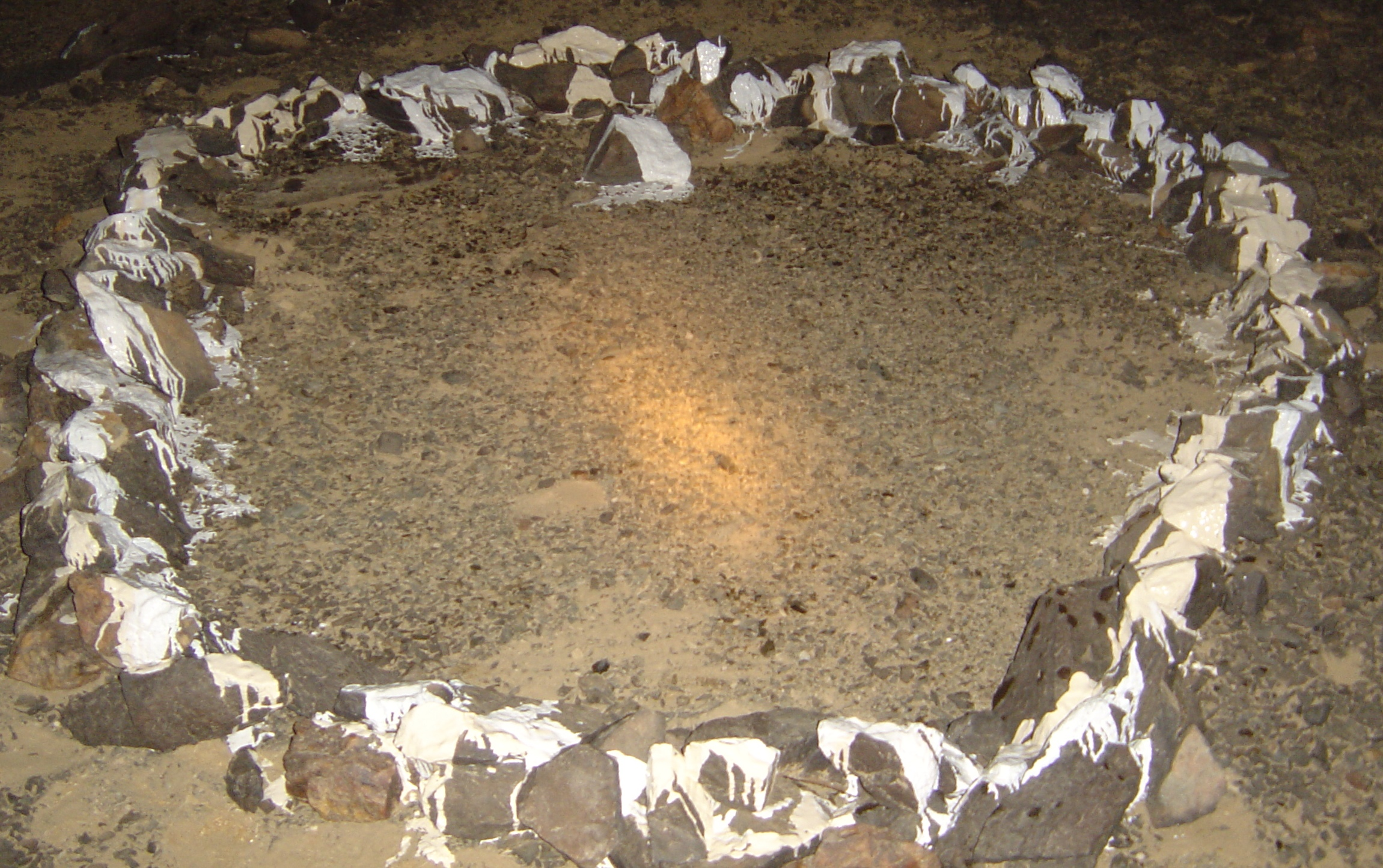
Grave of Aminah

- The place where Muhammad's mother, Aminah bint Wahb ibn Abd Manaf, died.
- It was here that Muhammad's cousin, Abu Sufyan ibn al-Harith, adopted Islam.
- The Seventh Twelver Shi'ite Imam and direct descendant of Muhammad, Musa al-Kadhim, was born in this town.
- In 744 C.E., after the assassination of the Umayyad Caliph Al-Walīd II, Al-'Abdallah met the Hashimites in the village of al-Abwā', when an oath of allegiance was pledged to his son Muhammad al-Nafs al-Zakiyya as the new Mahdi.

=== Military campaigns of Muhammad ===
The fourth caravan raid that Muhammad ordered, known as the invasion of Waddan, was the first offensive in which Muhammad took part personally with 70 troops, mostly Muhajirun.

It is said that twelve months after moving to Medina, Muhammad himself led a caravan raid to Waddan (Al-Abwā). The aim was to intercept the caravans of the Quraysh. The raid party did not meet any Quraysh during the raid. However, the caravan of the Banu Damrah was raided. Negotiations began and the two leaders signed a treaty of non-aggression. Banu Damrah pledged not to attack Muslims or side with the Quraysh; and Muhammad pledged not to attack, or seize the goods of, the caravans of the Banu Damrah.

== See also ==
- Hijaz Mountains
- List of cities and towns in Saudi Arabia
