= Suhaib =

Suhaib is a given name. Notable people with the name include:

- Suhaib Gasmelbari (born 1979), Sudanese film director, screenwriter, and cinematographer
- Suhaib Ilyasi (born 1966), Indian television producer and director
- Suhaib Webb (born 1972), American Muslim imam
