= Expedition of Zayd ibn Harithah (Hisma) =

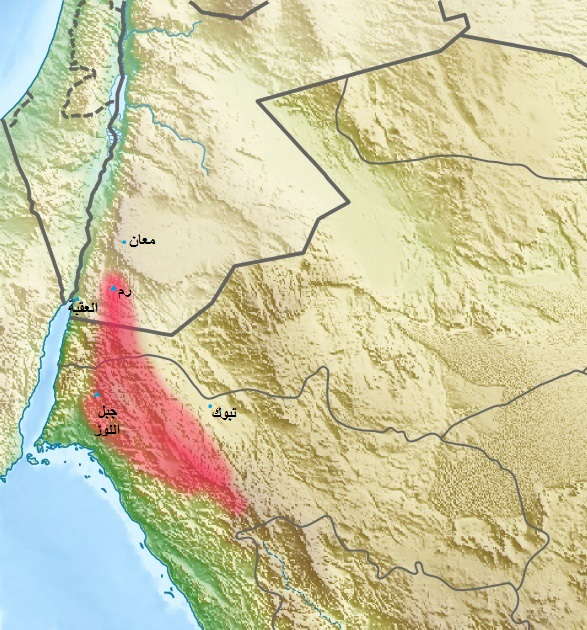
- Location of the Ḥismā region (shaded red) in Northwest Arabia
Date	October 628 in 6th month, AH 7
Location	Hisma region
Result	As follows: Successful raid, 1000 camels, 5000 cattle and a 100 tribe members captured; Al-Hunayd ibn Arid (enemy commander) and his son killed

Commanders and leaders
Zayd ibn Haritha	Al-Hunayd ibn Arid †

Strength
500	Unknown

Casualties and losses
Unknown	Many killed, including chief 100 captured

The expedition of Zayd ibn Harithah in Hisma took place in October 628, i.e. the 6th month of AH 7 of the Islamic calendar. The attack led by Zayd ibn Harithah was a response to Dihyah bin Khalifa Kalbi's call for help, after being attacked by robbers. Muslims retaliated and killed many of the robbers and captured 100 tribe members.

== Background ==
=== Envoys sent to invite people to Islam ===
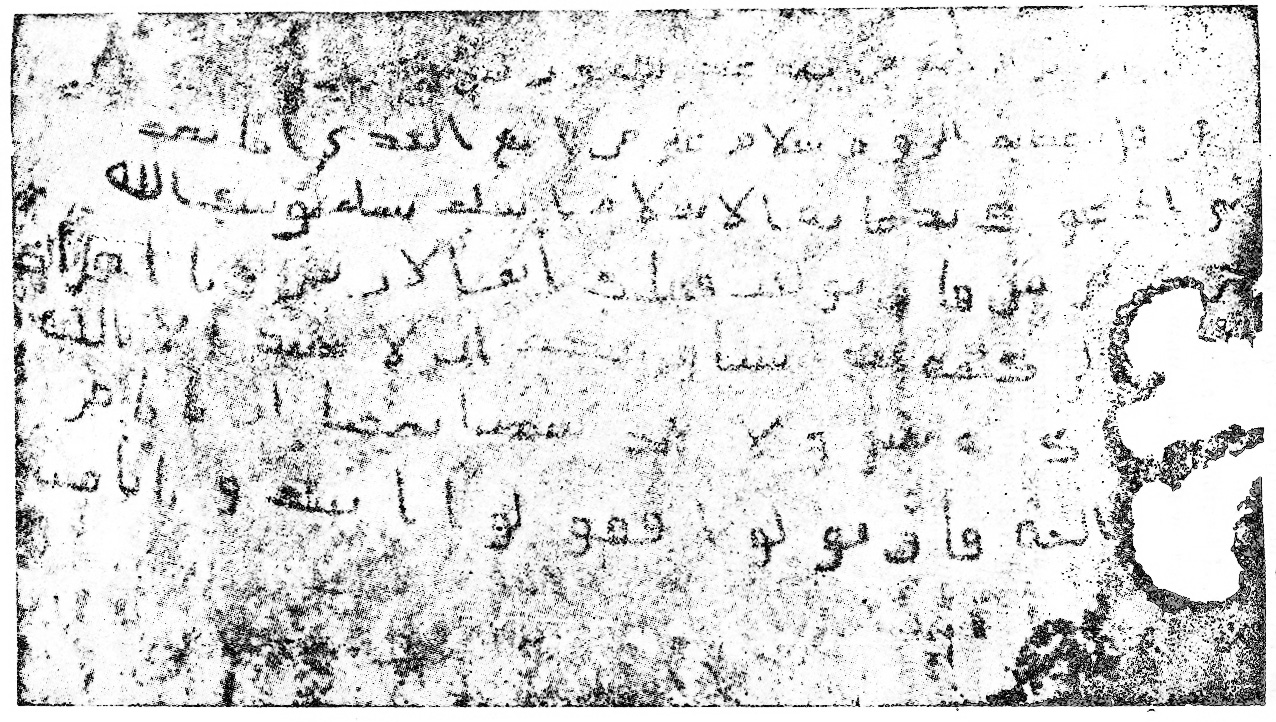
Purported letter of Muhammad to Heraclius, emperor of Byzantium.

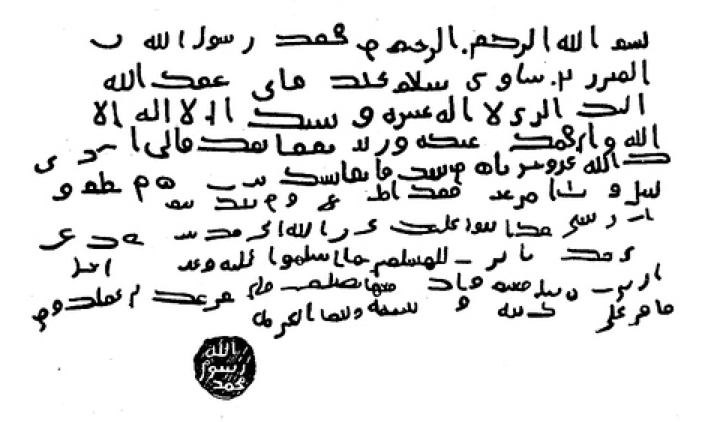
Purported letter of Muhammed to Munzir ibn Sawa Al-Tamimi.

After the signing the Hudaibiya Treaty with the Quraysh in Mecca, Muhammad sent several envoys in a few neighboring countries, inviting them to Islam. The following were sent:

- Amr bin Umayyah al-Damri to the king of Abyssinia called Ashamah ibn Abjar al-Najashi.
- Dihyah bin Khalifah al-Kalbi to the Roman Emperor Heraclius
- Hatib bin Abi Baltaeh to the king of Egypt called Muqawqis
- Allabn Al-Hazermi to Munzer bin Sawa the king of Bahrain called Munzir ibn Sawa Al Tamimi
- Amr ibn al-As to the king of Oman called Abd Al-Jalandi
- Salit bin Amri to the king of Yamama called Hawza bin Ali
- Shiya bin Wahab to Haris bin Ghasanni to the king of Damascus called Harith bin Abi Shamir Al-Ghassani
- Abdullah ibn Hudhafah as-Sahmi to the emperor of Persia called Khosrow II.

=== One envoy attacked by bandits ===
He sent Dhiyah bin Khalifah al-Kalbi to the king of Basra, who would in turn send it to Caesar (Heraclius).

In his epistle to Heraclius, the Roman emperor, Muhammad wrote:

"In the name of God, the Most Merciful, the Bestower of all Mercy

From Muhammad, son of Abdullah to Heraclius the Leader of the Romans:

Peace be upon he who follows the guidance.

Furthermore, I invite you with the invitation of peace. If you submit then you will find safety and God will double your reward. If you turn away, you will bear the peasants sins.

"O People of the Scripture! Come to a common word between us and you: that we shall worship none but God, and that we shall ascribe no partner unto Him, and that none of us shall take others for lords beside God. And if they turn away, then say: Bear witness that we are they who have surrendered (unto Him).

— Quran, Chapter: Aal Imran “The House of Joachim” 3:64”

When, after finishing his trip, Dhiyah was returning to Medina; a group of bandit belonging to Banu Judham looted him of everything he had, when he reached Hisma, a place on the way to Syria and west of Tabuk.

== Muslim response ==
Dhiyah approached the Banu Dubayb (a tribe which converted to Islam and had good relations with Muslims) for help. When the news reached Muhammad, he immediately dispatched Zayd ibn Haritha with 500 men to punish them. The Muslim army fought with Banu Judham, killed several of them (inflicting heavy casualties), including their chief, Al-Hunayd ibn Arid and his son, and captured 1000 camels, 5000 of their cattle and a 100 women and boys. The new chief of the Banu Judham who had embraced Islam appealed to Muhammad to release his fellow tribesmen, and Muhammad released them.

== See also ==
- Military career of Muhammad
- List of expeditions of Muhammad
