= Al Jumum =

- Governotate
- Location in Saudi Arabia
- Coordinates: 21°37′N 39°42′E
- Country: Saudi Arabia
- Province: Makkah Province
- Time zone: UTC+3 (EAT)
  - Summer (DST): UTC+3 (EAT)

Al Jumum is a governorate in Makkah Province, in western Saudi Arabia. The Expedition of Zaid ibn Haritha in al-Jumum took place in September, 627 CE, 6 AH of the Islamic calendar at this location during the era of the Islamic prophet Muhammad.

== See also ==
- List of cities and towns in Saudi Arabia
- Regions of Saudi Arabia
- List of battles of Muhammad
