= Patrol of Buwat =

Event in Early Islamic History, 632 CE

Date	2 AH / October 623 CE
Location	Buwat
Result	No military engagement as the caravan took another unknown route

Belligerents
Muslims of Medina	Quraysh of Mecca

Commanders and leaders
Muhammad	Umayyah ibn Khalaf

Strength
200	100 (1,500–2,500 Camels)

Casualties and losses
0	0

The Patrol of Buwat took place in October 623 or 2 A.H. of the Islamic calendar, in Rabi' al-Awwal. Muhammad went with a force of 200 men in order to raid parties of the Quraysh. Muhammad stayed at Buwat for some time and left without engaging in combat.

== Background and raid ==
Approximately a month after the patrol of Wadden, Muhammad personally led two hundred men including Muhajirs and Ansars to Bawat, a place on the caravan route of the Quraysh raiders led by Umayyah ibn Khalaf. Ibn Khalaf was believed to have tortured a Muslim named Bilal Ibn Rabah and had strongly opposed Islam. However, no battle took place. According to Haykal, Umayyah ibn Khalaf took another route. Muhammad then went up to Dhat al-Saq in the desert of al-Khabar. He prayed there and a mosque was built at the spot.

== See also ==
- List of expeditions of Muhammad
- Muhammad as a general
- Muslim–Quraysh War

Preceded by Patrol of Waddan	Expeditions of Muhammad	Succeeded by Patrol of Zul Al-Ushairah
