= Expedition of Zayd ibn Harithah (Wadi al-Qura) =

Date	November 627 AD, 7th month 6 AH
Location	Wadi al-Qura
Result	Ambush, 9 Muslims killed

Commanders and leaders
Zayd ibn Harithah	Unknown

Strength
12	Unknown

Casualties and losses
9 killed	Unknown

Expedition of Zayd ibn Harithah to Wadi al-Qura took place in November, 627AD, 7th month of 6AH of the Islamic calendar.

Wadi al-Qura was an oasis, about 7 miles from Medina. Zayd ibn Harithah set out with 12 men to survey this area and to monitor the movements of enemies of Muhammad.

However, the inhabitants in this area were unfriendly to Zayd. The people there attacked the Muslims, killed 9 of them, while the rest including Zaid bin Haritha managed to escape.

== See also ==
- Military career of Muhammad
- List of expeditions of Muhammad
- Muslim–Quraysh War
- Usama ibn Zayd
