= Expedition of Zayd ibn Harithah (Al-Is) =

Date	September 627 AD, 5th month 6 AH
Location	Al-Is
Result	Successful raid, much booty captured

Commanders and leaders
Zayd ibn Haritha	Abu al As

Strength
170 horsemen	Unknown

Casualties and losses
0	Unknown number captured

Expedition of Zayd ibn Harithah in al-Is took place in September, 627AD, 5th month of 6AH of the Islamic calendar

== Caravan Raid ==
Zayd ibn Harithah, in Jumada Al-Ula 6 Hijri, at the head of a 170 horsemen, set out to a place called Al-Is, intercepted a caravan of Quraish led by Abu al-As, Muhammad's relative and captured their camels as booty.

Among the prisoners was Abu al-As, the son-in-law of Muhammad, the husband of Zaynab, Muhammad’s eldest daughter. Abu al-As was the nephew of Khadija (Muhammad’s first wife) and a prosperous trader in Mecca. When Muhammad received the prophet hood, Abu al-As declined to embrace Islam. But he also refused to divorce Zaynab at the insistence of the Quraysh.

Abul-As escaped and took refuge in Zaynab’s house. He begged her to ask Muhammad for the restitution of his wealth. Muhammad recommended, but without coercion, that the people do that. They immediately gave the man back all his wealth.

Abu al-As captors immediately agreed to release him from their captivity. Abu al-As was greatly moved by this generosity; returned to Mecca, completed his affairs there, then returned to Medina and accepted Islam. He then rejoined his wife Zaynab.

The verse relating to prohibition of marriage between women Muslims and disbelievers had not been revealed then according to Muslim scholar Saifur Rahman al Mubarakpuri. In this expedition the whole caravan was plundered, and a large store of silver was captured, some of those who guarded the Caravan were taken prisoner.

== See also ==
- Military career of Muhammad
- List of expeditions of Muhammad
