= Banu Damrah =

The Banu Damrah were a tribe from around the time of the Islamic prophet Muhammad. They were involved in a conflict with him during the Invasion of Waddan and resided around al-Abwa area of Saudi Arabia.

== See also ==
- List of expeditions of Muhammad
