= Caravan raids =

Military tactic

Caravan raids are a surprise attack or incursion by a hostile force on a caravan, a group of merchants, pilgrims, or travelers journeying together.

== Examples ==
The traditional habit of Bedouin tribes of raiding other tribes, caravans, or settlements is known in Arabic as ghazzu.

Caravan raids have been described as a characteristic risk for travelers in the 19th-century Sahara desert and Kazakh Steppe. Caravan raids were also a risk for Hajj caravans through various historical periods, from the Crusades to the Ottoman period.

== See also ==
- Early Muslim–Meccan conflict
- 1757 Hajj caravan raid
- Commerce raiding
