= Banu Salim =

7th Century Arab Tribe

Banu Salim or Banu Saleem or Bani Salim was a tribe during the era of Muhammad. They participated in the Al Kudr Invasion. On his return from the Nakhla expedition to destroy al-Uzza, Khalid ibn Walid, with an army including the Banu Saleem, was dispatched once again in the Expedition of Khalid ibn al-Walid (Banu Jadhimah) to the home of the Bani Khuzaimah bedouins, who were Sabaeans.

== See also ==
- List of expeditions of Muhammad
- Masjid Bani Salim in Medina, the Hejaz
