= Patrol of al-Abwa =

623 event in Early Islamic History

- Part of the Muslim–Quraysh War
Date	30 December 623 AD / 12th Rajab 2 AH
Location	Waddan, Saudi Arabia
Result	No military engagement; Muslims sign a pact of friendship with the Banu Damrah

Belligerents
Muslims of Medina	Quraysh of Mecca

Commanders and leaders
Muhammad; Hamza ibn Abd al-Muttalib; Abu Ubayda ibn al-Jarrah	Abu Sufyan ibn Harb

Strength
70 soldiers	100 traders of a caravan

Casualties and losses
0	0

The Patrol of al-Abwa (Arabic: غزوة الأبواء) or Waddan (Arabic: غزوة وَدَّان) occurred on the 12th of Rajab in the second Hijri year or in Safar of the same year. Muhammad took a force of 70 men and when he reached Waddan, the Quraysh were not present. However, the Banu Damrah met with Muhammad and they established a peace agreement for mutual cooperation and safety. No fighting occurred during this campaign.

== Events ==
After Muhammad and his followers had migrated to Medina in 622, the Muslims attacked several of the Quraysh's caravans traveling from Syria to Mecca. During the patrol to Waddan, a Muslim force sought one of the Quraysh's caravans, but was unable to engage with it. The expedition encountered a group of men from the Banu Damrah clan of the Banu Kinanah tribe in the area, and negotiations between the two camps began. A pact of friendship between the Muslims and the Banu Damrah was then produced.

According to Muslim scholar Muhammad al-Zurqani, the treaty read:

"This document is from Muhammad, the Messenger of Allah, concerning the Banu Damrah in which [Muhammad] establishes for them safety and security in their wealth and lives. They can expect support from the Muslims unless they oppose the religion of Allah. They are also expected to respond positively if the Prophet seeks their help."

The treaty meant that both parties were forbidden from raiding each other, joining confederations hostile to one another, or supporting each other's enemies. William Montgomery Watt saw this as a deliberate attempt by Muhammad to provoke the Meccans.

== See also ==
- List of expeditions of Muhammad
- Military career of Muhammad
- Muslim–Quraysh War
- Banu Quraysh

Preceded by Kharrar raid	Expeditions of Muhammad	Succeeded by Patrol of Buwat
