= Zayd ibn Haritha al-Kalbi =

Companion and adopted son of the Islamic prophet Muhammad

Zayd ibn Ḥāritha زيد بن حارثة

Personal life
- Born: c. 581 CE Najd, Arabia (present-day KSA)
- Died: September 629 (aged 47–48) Mu'tah, Byzantine Empire (present-day Jordan)
- Cause of death: Killed at the Battle of Mu'tah
- Resting place: Al-Mazar, Mu'tah
- Spouse: Durrah bint Abu Lahab; Umm Ayman; Hind bint al-Awwam; Zaynab bint Jahsh (div.); Umm Kulthum bint Uqba; Humayma bint Sayfi
- Children: Usama; Zayd; Ruqayya
- Parent(s): Harithah ibn Sharahil (father); Suda bint Thaalaba (mother)
- Known for: Companion and adopted son of Muhammad
- Relations: Banu Kalb (tribe)

Religious life
- Religion: Islam

Military service
- Allegiance: Muhammad (623–629)
- Years&nsbp;of&nsbp;service: 623–629
- Rank: Military Commander (627–629)
- Battles/wars: For Muslims: Battle of Badr; Battle of Uhud; Battle of Hamra; Siege of Nadir; Battle of Trench; Siege of Qurayza; Siege of Lahyan; Battle of Khaybar; Battle of Mu'tah †

Zayd ibn Ḥāritha al-Kalbī (Arabic: زيد بن حارثة الكلبي) (c. 581–629 CE), was an early Muslim, Sahabi and the former adopted son of the Islamic prophet, Muhammad. He is commonly regarded as the fourth person to have accepted Islam, after Muhammad's wife Khadija, Muhammad's cousin Ali, and Muhammad's close companion Abu Bakr. Zayd was a slave that Hakim ibn Hizam, Khadija's nephew, bought for her at a market in Ukaz. Zayd then became her and Muhammad’s adopted son and took his lineage. His lineage was later restored just before he had his second wife Zaynab bint Jahsh divorced and married to Muhammad. He later went on to marry into Muhammad's family. Zayd ibn Harithah is the only companion of Prophet Muhammad explicitly mentioned by name in the Qur'an, in Surah Al-Ahzab (33:37).

Zayd was a commander in the early Muslim army and led several early military expeditions during the lifetime of Muhammad. Zayd led his final expedition in September 629 CE, when he set out to raid the Byzantine city of Bosra. However the Muslim army was intercepted by Byzantine forces and Zayd was subsequently killed at the Battle of Mu'tah.

== Childhood ==
Zayd is said to have been ten years younger than Muhammad, suggesting a birth-year of 581. He is also said to have been 55 (lunar) years old at his death in 629, indicating a birthdate of 576.

He was born into the Udhra branch of the Kalb tribe in the Najd region, central Arabia. He claimed a pedigree twelfth in descent from Udhra ibn Zayd al-Lat ibn Rufayda ibn Thawr ibn Kalb ibn Wabara. Zayd's mother, Suda bint Thaalaba, was from the Maan branch of the Tayy tribe.

When Zayd was around 8, or "a young boy of an age at which he could be a servant" he accompanied his mother on a visit to her family. While they were staying with the Maan tribe, horsemen from the Qayn tribe raided their tents and kidnapped Zayd. They took him to the market at Ukkaz and sold him as a slave for 400 dinars.

Zayd's family searched for him, but without success. A lament is attributed to his father, Harithah ibn Sharahil (BaSharahil):

I weep for Zayd, not knowing what became of him.
Is he alive, is he to be expected, or has Death come over him?
By God, I ask yet do not comprehend.
Was it the plain or the mountain that brought about your end?
I wish that I knew: Will you ever return?
In this world only for your coming back I yearn.
The sun reminds me of him when it dawns, evoking his memory as the dusk falls.
When the winds blow, they stir up memories like dust.
O how long my sorrow and fear for him last!

== Slavery in Mecca ==
Zayd was purchased by a merchant of Mecca, Hakim ibn Hizam, who gave the boy as a present to his aunt, Khadijah bint Khuwaylid. He remained in her possession until the day she married Muhammad, when she gave the slave as a wedding present to her bridegroom. Muhammad became very attached to Zayd, to whom he referred as al-Ḥabīb (Arabic: ٱلْحَبِيْب, lit. 'the Beloved').

Some years later, some members of Zayd's tribe happened to arrive in Mecca on pilgrimage. They encountered Zayd and recognised each other, and he asked them to take a message home.

Carry a message from me to my people,
for I am far away, that close to the House and the places of pilgrimage I stay.
Let go of the grief that has deeply saddened you,
and do not hasten your camels all over the earth.
I live with the best of families, may God be blessed;
from father to son, of Ma'ad they are the noblest.

On receiving this message, Zayd's father and uncle immediately set out for Mecca. They found Muhammad at the Kaaba and promised him any ransom if he would return Zayd to them. Muhammad replied that Zayd should be allowed to choose his fate, but that if he wished to return to his family, Muhammad would release him without accepting any ransom in exchange. They called for Zayd, who easily recognised his father and uncle, but told them that he did not want to leave Muhammad, "for I have seen something in this man, and I am not the kind of person who would ever choose anyone in preference to him." At this, Muhammad took Zayd to the steps of the Kaaba, where legal contracts were agreed and witnessed, and announced to the crowds: "Witness that Zayd becomes my son, with mutual rights of inheritance." On seeing this, Zayd's father and uncle "were satisfied," and they returned home without him.

In accordance with the Arabic custom of adoption at the time, Zayd was thereafter known as "Zayd ibn Muhammad" and was a freedman, regarded socially and legally as Muhammad's son.

== Conversion to Islam ==
At an unknown date before 610, Zayd accompanied Muhammad to Ta'if, where it was a tradition to sacrifice meat to the idols. Near Baldah on their way back to Mecca, they met Zayd ibn Amr and offered him some of the cooked meat that Zayd was carrying in their bag. Zayd ibn Amr, an outspoken monotheist, replied, "I do not eat anything which you slaughter in the name of your stone idols. I eat none but those things on which Allah's Name has been mentioned at the time of slaughtering." After this encounter, said Muhammad, "I never stroked an idol of theirs, nor did I sacrifice to them, until God honoured me with his apostleship."

When Muhammad reported in 610 that he had received a revelation from the angel Jibril (Gabriel), Zayd was one of the first converts to Islam. While Khadijah was the first Muslim of all in the Ummah of Muhammad, she was closely followed by her neighbour Lubaba bint al-Harith, her four daughters, and the first male converts, Ali, Zayd and Abu Bakr.

== The Hijrah ==
In 622, Zayd joined the other Muslims in the Hijrah to Medina. Once settled in the new city, Muhammad urged each Muslim to "take a brother in Religion" so that each would have an ally in the community. Zayd was paired with Muhammad's uncle Hamza. Hamza accordingly trusted his last testament to Zayd just before his death in 625.

A few months later, Muhammad and Abu Bakr sent Zayd back to Mecca to escort their families to Medina. The return party consisted of Muhammad's wife Sawda, his daughters Umm Kulthum and Fatimah, his servant Abu Rafi, Zayd's wife Baraka and their son Usama, Abu Bakr's wife Umm Rumman, his children Asma, Abdullah and Aisha, and a guide named Abdullah ibn Urayqit, and Abu Bakr's kinsman Talhah also decided to accompany them.

== Marriages and children ==
Zayd married at least six times.

1. Durrah (Fakhita) bint Abi Lahab, a cousin of Muhammad. They were divorced; the dates are unknown, but Durrah's two brothers were divorced from Muhammad's two daughters in 613.
2. Umm Ayman (Barakah), Muhammad's freedwoman and mother of Ayman ibn Ubayd. They were married "after Islam" and their son was born in 612.
3. Hind bint Al-Awwam, a niece of Khadijah.
4. Humayma bint Sayfi (Umm Mubashshir), the widow of Al-Baraa ibn Maarur, a chief in Medina. Al-Baraa died in August or September 622, so the marriage to Zayd was presumably in or after 623.
5. Zaynab bint Jahsh, a cousin of Muhammad. They were married in 625 and divorced in 627.
6. Umm Kulthum bint Uqba, a maternal sister of Caliph Uthman. This marriage was ordered by Muhammad in 628, but it ended in divorce."

Zayd had three children.

1. Usama, son of Barakah, who had descendants, but their number "never exceeded twenty in any given generation."
2. Zayd, son of Umm Kulthum, who died in infancy.
3. Ruqayya, daughter of Umm Kulthum, who died while under the care of Uthman.

=== Marriage to Zaynab bint Jahsh ===
Around 625, Muhammad proposed that his cousin, Zaynab bint Jahsh, should marry Zayd. At first, she refused on the grounds that she was of the Quraysh. It has been suggested that differences between Zaynab's social status and Zayd's were precisely the reason why Muhammad wanted to arrange the marriage:

The Prophet was well aware that it is a person's standing in the eyes of Allah that is important, rather than his or her status in the eyes of the people ... their marriage would demonstrate that it was not who their ancestors were, but rather their standing in the sight of Allah, that mattered.

By contrast, Montgomery Watt points out that Zayd was high in Muhammad's esteem.

She can hardly have thought that he was not good enough. She was an ambitious woman, however, and may already have hoped to marry Muhammad, or she may have wanted to marry someone with whom Muhammad did not want his family to be so closely allied.

The Verse of the Qur'an, 33:36,

It is not fitting for a Believer, man or woman when a matter has been decided by Allah and His Messenger to have any option about their decision: if anyone disobeys Allah and His Messenger, he is indeed on a clearly wrong Path,

— Sura al-Ahzab Quran 213 EB 33:36 (translated by Yusuf Ali)

Zaynab acquiesced and married Zayd.

=== Divorce from Zaynab ===
The marriage lasted less than two years.

A story rejected by Muslim scholars, was later proposed by the 9th-century historians Ibn Sa'd and al-Tabari, in which Muhammad paid a visit to Zayd's house: the hairskin curtain that served as Zayd's front door was blown aside, accidentally revealing Zaynab dressed only in her shift. Zaynab arose to dress herself, advising Muhammad that Zayd was not at home but he was welcome to visit. However, he did not enter. He exclaimed to himself, “Praise be to Allah, who turns hearts around!” and then departed. When Zayd came home, Zaynab told him what had happened. Zayd went to Muhammad, saying: "Prophet, I have heard about your visit. Perhaps you admire Zaynab, so I will divorce her." Muhammad replied, "No, fear Allah and keep your wife."

After this, they report there having been a conflict between the couple, and Zaynab shut Zayd out of the bedroom. Zayd divorced Zaynab in December 626.

The story has been rejected by most Muslim scholars mainly because of its lack of having any chain of narration and its complete absence from any authentic hadith. Some commentators have commented it being absurd that Muhammad would suddenly become aware of Zaynab's beauty one day after having known her all her life; if her beauty had been the reason for Muhammad to marry her, he would have married her himself in the first place rather than arranging her marriage to Zayd.

According to the translator Fishbein:

Zaynab, who was Muhammad's cousin, had been married by Muhammad's arrangement to Muhammad's freed slave Zayd b. Harithah, who lived in Muhammad's household and came to be regarded as his adoptive son - so that he was regularly addressed as Zayd, son of Muhammad. Whether the marriage between Zayd and Zaynab was a mesalliance from the beginning is speculation, though the account maintains that Zayd was not reluctant to divorce his wife and allow her to marry Muhammad. Muhammad is portrayed as reluctant to proceed with the marriage because of scruples about whether marrying one's adopted son's former wife violated the prohibited degrees of marriage. Arab customary practice recognized kinship relations not based on blood ties: fosterage (having nursed from the same woman) was one such relationship; the question whether adoption fell into this category must have been unclear among Muslims. The marriage did not take place until after a Qur'anic revelation was received, giving permission for believers to marry the divorced wives of their adopted sons.

Historiographic assessments suggest that the "lovestruck" narratives themselves were a fabrication that developed over a century after the death of Muhammad.

=== Change of adoption laws in Islam ===
After these events, the traditional Arab form of adoption was no longer recognized in Islam; it was replaced by kafala. Three verses of the Qur'an were revealed about this. Al-Tabari states that Q33:40 was revealed because "the Munafiqun [hypocrites] made this a topic of their conversation and reviled the Prophet, saying 'Muhammad prohibits [marriage] with the [former] wives of one's own sons, but he married the [former] wife of his son Zayd.'"

Muhammad is not the father of any of your men, but (he is) the Messenger of Allah, and the Seal of the Prophets: and Allah has full knowledge of all things.

— Sura al-Ahzab Quran 33:40 (translated by Yusuf Ali)

Zayd reverted to being known by his original name of Zayd ibn Harithah and was no longer considered Muhammad's legal son after the revelation of Q33:5:

Call them by their fathers' names ...

— Sura al-Ahzab Quran 33:5 (translated by Yusuf Ali)

Ibn Saad indicates that Q33:37 was a specific instruction to Muhammad and Zaynab to marry and that it explains why their marriage was necessary.

Behold! Thou didst say to one who had received the grace of Allah and thy favour: "Retain thou (in wedlock) thy wife, and fear Allah." But thou didst hide in thy heart that which Allah was about to make manifest: thou didst fear the people, but it is more fitting that thou shouldst fear Allah. Then when Zaid had dissolved (his marriage) with her, with the necessary (formality), We joined her in marriage to thee: in order that (in future) there may be no difficulty to the Believers in (the matter of) marriage with the wives of their adopted sons, when the latter have dissolved with the necessary (formality) (their marriage) with them. And Allah's command must be fulfilled.

— Sura al-Ahzab Quran 33:37 (translated by Yusuf Ali)

== Military expeditions ==
Zayd was "one of the famous archers among the Prophet's Companions." He fought at Uhud, Trench and Khaybar, and was present at the expedition to Hudaybiyyah. When Muhammad raided Al-Muraysi, he left Zayd behind as governor in Medina.

Zayd commanded seven military expeditions.

1. Al-Qarada in November 624. He captured a caravan of merchandise, but most of the Meccan merchants escaped.
2. Al-Jumum in September 627.
3. Al-'Is in October 627.
4. At-Taraf, a raid in the Nakhl region "on the road to Iraq".
5. Wadi al-Qura. Zayd raided the area in November 627, but the Fazara tribe counter-attacked, killing some of the Muslims, while Zayd was carried wounded from the field. Zayd swore revenge and, after he had recovered from his injuries in January 628, he returned to Wadi al-Qura with a larger army. This time he defeated the Fazari.
6. Hisma, or Khushayn, against the Judham tribe in October 628.
7. The Battle of Mu'tah in September 629, where Zayd was killed.

According to Aisha, "The Messenger of Allah did not ever send Zayd ibn Haritha in an army without putting him in command of it, even if he stayed after he appointed him."

Umm Qirfa Fatima was a member of the Banu Fazara. She married into the Banu Badr. According to Ibn Ishaq and al-Tabari, Umm Qirfa was wealthy. She was described as being an old woman with high social status and wife of Malik ibn Hudhayfa ibn Badr al-Fazari. After her thirty horsemen were defeated by Zayd ibn Haritha, Muhammad ordered Qirfa or her children to be slaughtered "by putting a rope into her two legs and to two camels and driving them until they rent her in two..." Two of her limbs were torn in to two by four camels, her severed head was later paraded all over the streets of Medina.

Allah’s Messenger sent Zayd to Wadi Qura, where he encountered the Banu Fazarah. Some of his Companions were killed, and Zayd was carried away wounded. Ward was slain by the Banu Badr. When Zayd returned, he vowed that no washing should touch his head until he had raided the Fazarah. After he recovered, Muhammad sent him with an army against the Fazarah settlement. He met them in Qura and inflicted casualties on them and took Umm Qirfah prisoner. He also took Abdallah bin Mas’adah prisoner. Ziyad bin Harithah ordered Qays to kill Umm Qirfah, and he killed her cruelly. He tied each of her legs with a rope and tied the ropes to two camels, and they split her in two.

— Al-Tabari, Michael Fishbein - The History of al-Tabari, 8 (The Victory of Islam), SUNYP, pp. 95-97, 1997

But the story is transmitted through weak chains of transmission.

As for the first narration, which was mentioned by al-Tabari, the sequence of its chain of transmission is as follows:

Muhammad bin Hamid Al-Razi → Ibn Ishaq → Abdullah bin Abi Bakr

There are two problems with the chain. Muhammad ibn Hamid al-Razi considered unreliable transmitter by Al-Nasa'i , Abu Ishaq al-Jawzjani, and others. Also, Ibn Ishaq narrates it on the authority of Abdullah Ibn Abu Bakr, even though the time difference between them was 69 years. Ali ibn Naayif Ash-Shahood in his book Al-Mufassal Fi Ar-Radd ‘Ala Shubuhaat A’daa’ Al-Islam states about this matter:

This narration was reported in Tabaqaat Ibn Sa’d, and Ibn Al-Jawzi reported it from him in his book entitled Al-Muntathim, and the source of the narration is Muhammad ibn ‘Umar Al-Waaqidi, who was accused of lying according to the scholars of Hadeeth. The story was also reported in brief by Ibn Kathir in Al-Bidaayah Wan-Nihaayah, but he did not comment on it at all. Ibn Hishaam mentioned it as well in his book entitled As-Seerah; both of them narrated it from Muhammad ibn Is-haaq who did not mention the chain of narrators of this narration. To conclude, the narration is not authentic so it is not permissible to use it as evidence.

— Ali ibn Naayif Ash-Shahood, Al-Mufassal Fi Ar-Radd ‘Ala Shubuhaat A’daa’ Al-Islam

Al-Waqidi has been condemned as an untrustworthy narrator and has been frequently and severely criticized by scholars, thus his narrations have been abandoned by the majority of hadith scholars. Yahya ibn Ma'een said: "Al-Waqidi narrated 20,000 false hadith about the prophet". Al-Shafi'i, Ahmad ibn Hanbal and Al-Albani said: "Al-Waqidi is a liar" while Al-Bukhari said he didn't include a single letter by Al-Waqidi in his hadith works.

On the other hand, the story goes against the Prophet Muhammad's orders to merciful killing and forbid mutilation.

Fight in the name of Allah and in the way of Allah. Fight against those who disbelieve in Allah. Fight, do not embezzle the spoils; do not break your pledge; and do not mutilate (the dead) bodies; do not kill the children.

— Sahih Muslim, Hadith No.1731

Verily Allah has enjoined goodness to everything; so when you kill, kill in a good way and when you slaughter, slaughter in a good way. So every one of you should sharpen his knife, and let the slaughtered animal die comfortably.

— Sahih Muslim, Hadith No.1955

In, Safi-Ur-Rahman Al-Mubarakpuri in his book Ar-Raheeq Al-Makhtum tells that Umm Qirfa wanted to kill Muhammad:

An expedition led by Abu Bakr As-Siddiq or Zaid bin Haritha was despatched to Wadi Al-Qura in Ramadan 6 Hijri after Fazara sept had made an attempt at the Prophet’s life. Following the Morning Prayer, the detachment was given orders to raid the enemy. Some of them were killed and others captured. Umm Qira’s attempt at the Prophet’s life recoiled on her, and the thirty horsemen she had gathered and sustained to implement her evil scheme were all killed.

— Sheikh Safi-ur-Rahman al-Mubarkpuri, Ar-Raheeq Al-Makhtum (The Sealed Nectar): Biography of the Prophet, Ar-Raheeq Al-Makhtum: The Sealed Nectar – Biography Of The Noble Prophet [Revised Edition January 2002], page 337

== Death in the Battle of Mu'tah and aftermath ==
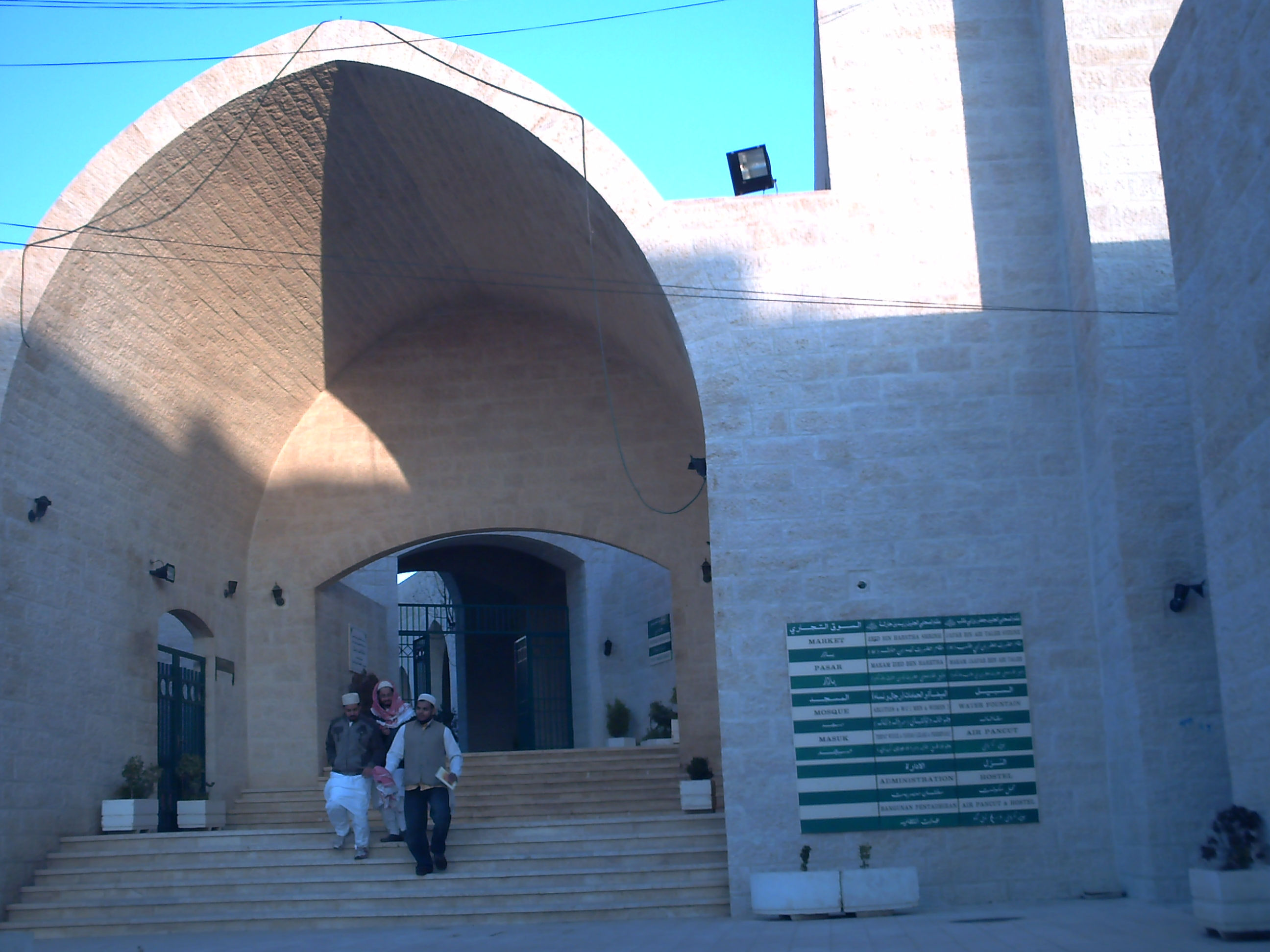
The mausoleum of Zayd ibn Ḥārithah in Jordan.

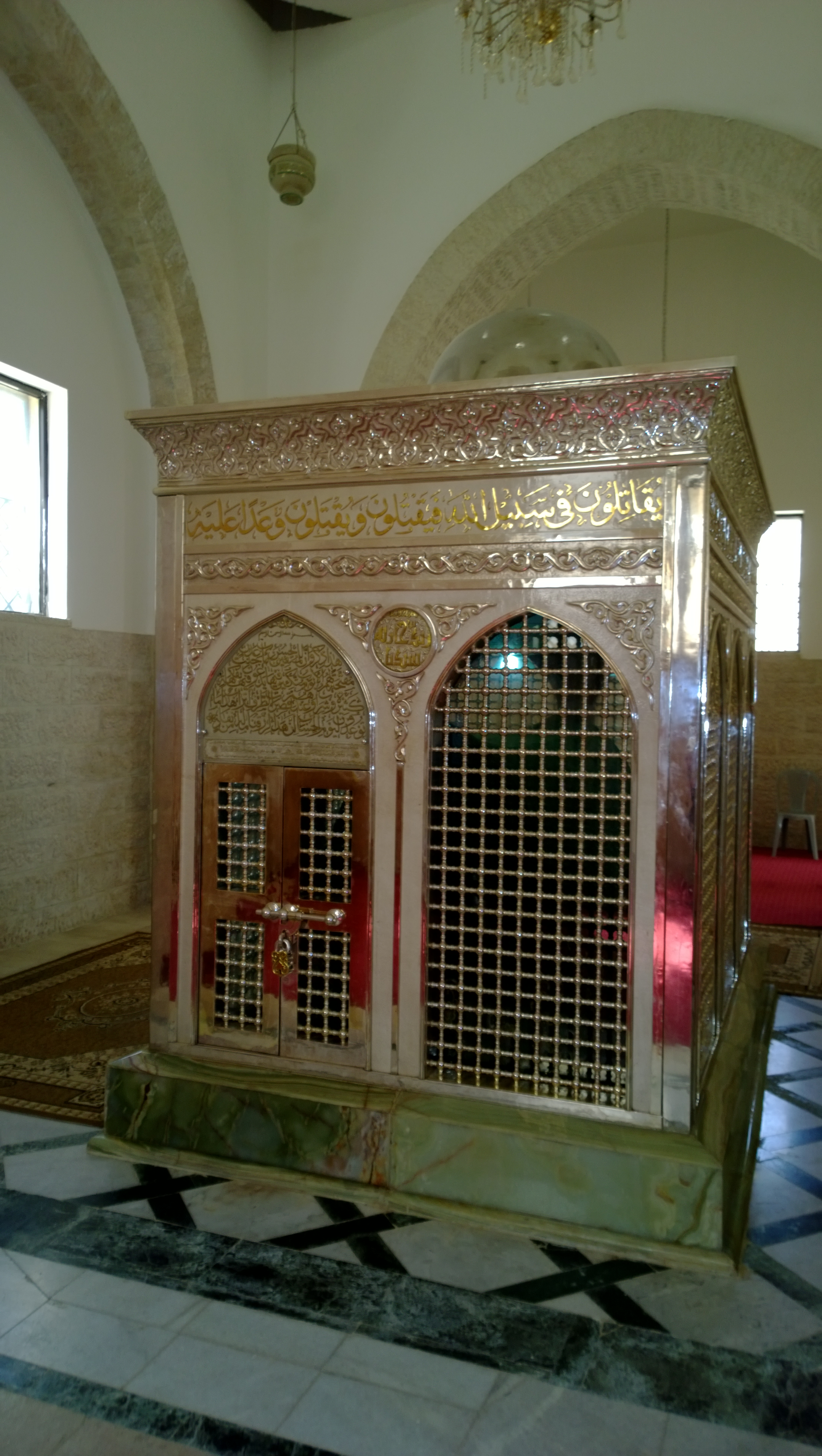
Zayd's grave

Zayd ibn Harithah led his final expedition in September 629 C.E. A Muslim force of 3,000 men set out to raid the Byzantine city of Bosra. However, a Byzantine force of "100,000 Greeks joined by 100,000 men from Lakhm and Judham and Al-Qayn and Bahra' and Bali" intercepted them at a village called 'Mu'tah' in present-day Jordan. Zayd held the standard at the battle, until he was struck down by a spear-thrust and he bled to death. The other two leaders, Ja`far ibn Abī Tālib and `Abd Allāh ibn Rawāḥah, were also killed, and the Muslim army was routed.

On hearing of Zayd's death, Muhammad went to the family. "The daughter of Zayd wept before the Messenger of Allah and the Messenger of Allah wept until he sobbed. Saad ibn Ubada said, 'Messenger of Allah, what is this?' He answered, 'This is the yearning of the lover for the beloved.'"

== Family tree ==
**Kilab ibn Murrah**	**Fatimah bint Sa'd**
**Zuhrah ibn Kilab** (progenitor of Banu Zuhrah) maternal great-great-grandfather	**Qusai ibn Kilab** paternal great-great-great-grandfather	**Hubba bint Hulail** paternal great-great-great-grandmother
**`Abd Manaf ibn Zuhrah** maternal great-grandfather	**`Abd Manaf ibn Qusai** paternal great-great-grandfather	**Atikah bint Murrah** paternal great-great-grandmother
**Wahb ibn `Abd Manaf** maternal grandfather	**Hashim ibn 'Abd Manaf** (progenitor of Banu Hashim) paternal great-grandfather	**Salma bint `Amr** paternal great-grandmother
**Fatimah bint `Amr** paternal grandmother	**`Abdul-Muttalib** paternal grandfather	Halah bint Wuhayb paternal step-grandmother
**Aminah** mother	**`Abdullah** father	Az-Zubayr paternal uncle	Harith paternal half-uncle	Hamza paternal half-uncle
Thuwaybah first nurse	Halimah second nurse	Abu Talib paternal uncle	`Abbas paternal half-uncle	Abu Lahab paternal half-uncle	6 other sons and 6 daughters
**Muhammad**	Khadija first wife	`Abd Allah ibn `Abbas paternal cousin
**Fatimah** daughter	Ali paternal cousin and son-in-law family tree, descendants	**Qasim** son	**`Abd-Allah** son
**Zainab** daughter	**Ruqayyah** daughter	Uthman second cousin and son-in-law family tree	**Umm Kulthum** daughter
**Ali ibn Zainab** grandson	**Umamah bint Zainab** granddaughter	**`Abd-Allah ibn Uthman** grandson	Rayhana bint Zayd wife
**Muhsin ibn Ali** grandson	**Hasan ibn Ali** grandson	**Husayn ibn Ali** grandson family tree	**Umm Kulthum bint Ali** granddaughter	**Zaynab bint Ali** granddaughter	Safiyya tenth wife
Abu Bakr father-in-law family tree	Sawda third wife	Umar father-in-law family tree	Umm Salama sixth wife	Juwayriya eighth wife	Maymuna eleventh wife
Aisha third wife Family tree	Zaynab fifth wife	Hafsa fourth wife	Zaynab seventh wife	Umm Habiba ninth wife	Maria al-Qibtiyya twelfth wife
**Ibrahim** son

- * indicates that the marriage order is disputed
- Note that direct lineage is marked in **bold**.

== See also ==
- Islamic adoptional jurisprudence
- Companions of the Prophet
- List of expeditions of Muhammad
- Expedition of Zayd ibn Harithah (disambiguation)

== Sources ==
- Bearman, Peri; Bianquis, Thierry; Bosworth, C. Edmund; Donzel, E. J. van, eds. (2002-06-27). Encyclopaedia of Islam, Volume XI (V-Z). Brill. ISBN 978-90-04-12756-2.
- De Premare, A.-L. (1994). "Umm Qirfa et Salmâ, et le mythe des peuples anéantis". Journal asiatique. 282 (1): 19–35. doi:10.2143/JA.282.1.2006115. ISSN 1783-1504.
- Powers, David S. (2014-05-08). Zayd: the little-known story of Muhammad's adopted son. University of Pennsylvania Press. ISBN 978-0-8122-0995-2.
