= Military career of Ali =

Ali عَلِيّ
- عَلِيّ بْن أَبِي طَالِب
- Masjid an-Nabawi Calligraphy of Ali's name
- Born: Ali ibn Abi Talib c. 600 CE; Mecca, Arabia
- Died: 28 January 661 (21 Ramadan AH 40) (aged 60–61); Kufa, Rashidun Caliphate
- Burial place: Believed to be Imam Ali Shrine, Iraq
- Spouses: Fatima bint Muhammad; Umama bint Abi al-As; Fatima bint Huzam; Asma bint Umais; Khawla al-Hanafiyya; Layla bint Mas'ud; Al-Sahba bint Rabi'a; Umm Sa'id bint Urwa; Muhayya bint Imru al-Qays
- Children: Children of Ali
- Military career
- Allegiance: Muslims (624–632); Caliphate (656–661)
- Service years: 624–632, 656–661
- Rank: Lieutenant-General of the Muslim Army (624–632); Commander-in-chief of the Rashidun army (656–661)
- Nickname: See names & titles of Ali
- Conflicts: Under Muhammad; Battle of Badr; Siege of Banu Qaynuqa; Invasion of Sawiq; Invasion of Buhran; Battle of Uhud; Battle of Hamra al-Asad; Siege of Banu Nadir; Expedition of Badr al-Maw'id; Expedition of Dhat al-Riqa; Expedition of Dumat al-Jandal; Expedition of al-Muraysi'; Battle of the Trench; Invasion of Banu Qurayza; Invasion of Banu Lahyan; Expedition of Fadak; Conquest of Fadak; Battle of Khaybar; Third Expedition of Wadi al Qura; Conquest of Mecca; Battle of Hunayn; Battle of Autas; Siege of Ta'if; Expedition of al-Fuls; Expedition of Mudhij; Expedition of Banu Hamdan; Under the Rashidun Caliphate; Ridda Wars; Battle of Dhu al-Qassah; Uprisings against Uthman (654–656); As the Fourth Caliph; First Fitna; Battle of the Camel; Battle of Marj Marina (657); Battle of Siffin; Umayyad invasions of Egypt (657–658); Kharijite Rebellions against Ali; Battle of Nahrawan; Banu Najiyah revolt; Battle of Kafr Tutha (658); Hadhrami Rebellion (659); Battle of Ayn al-Tamr (659); Battle of Tayma (659); Persian revolts against Ali; Ali's Eastern Campaigns

Ali ibn Abi Talib took part in all the battles of the Islamic prophet Muhammad's time, except the Expedition of Tabuk, as standard bearer. His sword was named Zulfiqar. He also led raids into enemy territory and served as an ambassador. Ali’s reputation grew with every battle, due to his courage, valor, and chivalry, and he was credited with defeating many of Arabia’s most renowned warriors. Muhammad recognized him as one of the greatest warriors of his era.

== The Battle of Badr ==
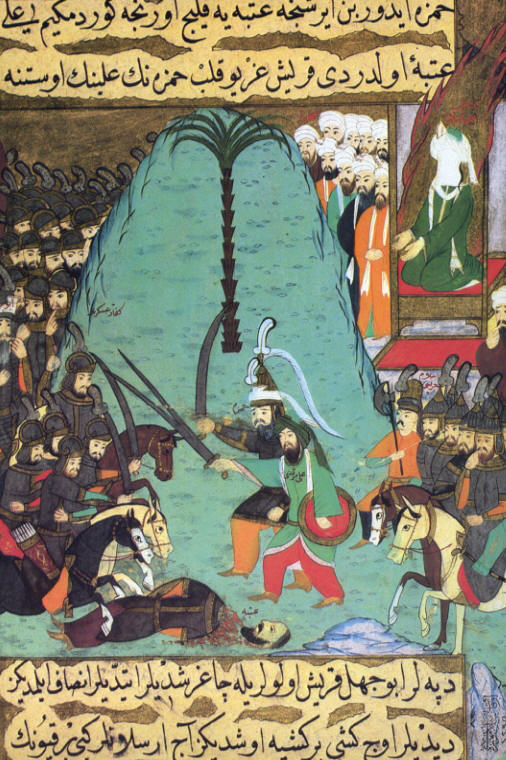
Hamza ibn Abd al-Muttalib and Ali lead the Muslim armies during the Battle of Badr.

=== Scouting ===
Muhammad did not know that an army had left Mecca, was marching toward Medina to protect the caravan of the Quraysh, and to challenge the Muslims. When Muhammad arrived in the environs of Badr, he sent Ali to reconnoiter the surrounding country. At the wells of Badr, Ali surprised some water-carriers. In reply to his questions, they told him that they were carrying water for an army which came from Makkah, and which was encamped on the other side of the nearby hills.

Ali brought the water-carriers before Muhammad. From them he learned that the caravan of the Quraysh had already escaped, and that the Muslims, at that very moment, were confronted by the army of Mecca.

On reaching the neighbourhood of Badr, Muhammad sent forward Ali, with a few others, to reconnoiter the rising ground above the springs. There they surprised three water-carriers of the enemy, as they were about to fill their sheepskins. One escaped to the Quraysh; the other two were captured and taken to the Muslim army. From them Muhammad discovered the proximity of his enemy. There were 950 men; more than threefold the number of the Moslem army. They were mounted on 700 camels and 100 horses, the horsemen all clad in mail. (Sir William Muir, The Life of Mohammed, London, 1877)

=== Battle ===
The battle began in the traditional Arab fashion of having a few warriors fight one-on-one before the general battle. Three warriors from the polytheists' army, Utbah ibn Rabia, Shaiba ibn Rabia, and Walid ibn Utbah, stepped up to challenge the Muslims. Their challenges were taken up by Hamza ibn Abd al-Muttalib, the uncle of Muhammad and Ali, Ubayda ibn al-Harith, a cousin of Muhammad and Ali, and Ali ibn Abi Talib.

Ali's duel against Walid ibn Utba, one of Mecca's fiercest warriors, was the first of three one-on-one duels. After a few amazing blows were exchanged, Walid was killed. Hamza then engaged Shaybah ibn Rab'iah and cut him down immediately. Ubayda ibn Harith, the third Muslim champion, however, received a fatal wound from Utbah ibn Rab'iah. Ali and Hamza hastily dispatched Ut'bah ibn Rab'iah, carrying Ubaida to die in the Muslim lines.

By noon the battle was over. The Quraysh fled. Seventy of the enemy had fallen and Ali had killed thirty-five, champions and commanders of enemy alone. Tabari in his book Tarik al Tabari mentioned all the 36 commanders by their name who were killed by Ali ibn Abi Talib in this battle. An equal number was captured. The believers had lost fourteen men on the field of battle.

Ali first distinguished himself as a warrior in 624, at the Battle of Badr. He defeated the Umayyad champion Walid ibn Utba as well as many other Meccan soldiers. His art of battle was so brilliant that in the battle, thirty five out of seventy polytheists were killed by Ali alone.

== The Battle of Uhud ==
In March 625, a Meccan army of three thousand warriors led by Abu Sufyan marched toward Medina to confront the Muslims. This force consisted primarily of infantry supported by a significant cavalry wing under the command of Khalid ibn al-Walid. The Meccan objective was to draw the Muslim forces out of their defensive positions in the city and destroy them in open terrain near Mount Uhud.

Ali ibn Abi Talib served as a primary commander and the standard bearer for the Muslim army. During the initial phase of the battle, the conflict followed the traditional Arabian custom of individual duels. Ali was called forward to face the Meccan standard bearer, Talha ibn Abi Talha. In the ensuing combat, Ali successfully struck down his opponent, which boosted the morale of the Muslim ranks and triggered a general charge. According to the historian Ibn Athir, Ali eventually killed eight or nine standard bearers of the Meccan army as they attempted to raise their fallen flag. This offensive, led by Ali and Hamza, initially broke the Meccan ranks and forced them to yield ground.

As the battle progressed, a breach in the Muslim lines occurred when the archers abandoned their positions on the hill to claim war spoils. This tactical error allowed the Meccan cavalry to outflank the infantry and created a state of chaos. During the subsequent retreat, a rumor spread that Muhammad had been killed, causing Muslim morale to plunge. Muhammad remained largely isolated with only a few soldiers left to defend against the flanking maneuvers of Khalid ibn al-Walid.

Historical accounts emphasize Ali's defensive actions during this critical moment. Under Muhammad's direction, Ali repeatedly charged and dispersed various units of the Meccan army that attempted to storm their position. In one instance, Ali reportedly engaged a regiment of fifty horsemen on foot, successfully scattering them after multiple charges. It was during this defense that the famous proclamation regarding Ali and his sword, Zulfiqar, was reportedly heard. This holding action continued until Muhammad was moved to a more secure and elevated position on the mountain.

== The Battle of the Trench ==
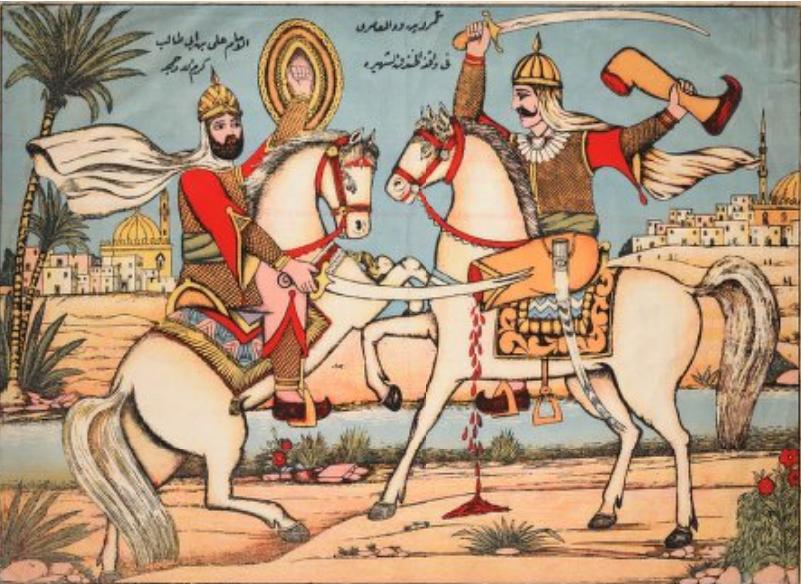
A depicted painting of combat between Ali ibn Abi Talib (left) and Amr Ben Wad during Battle of the trench

This battle is also known as the battle of the trench. Ali ibn Abi Talib fought alongside Muhammad. After the battle of Uhud, Abu Sufyan and the other pagan leaders realized that they had fought an indecisive action, and that their victory had not borne fruits for them. Islam had, in fact, resiled from its reverse at Uhud, and within an astonishingly short time, had reestablished its authority in Medina and the surrounding areas. Again Ali proved to be an invincible warrior by killing Amr ibn Abd al-Wud who was one of the most feared warriors at the time. After Ali dropped Amr ibn wod al ameree off his horse, Amr spat at Ali. Ali got angry, and so he walked away for a moment and then got back after he calmed down, he told Amr ibn wod al ameree "If I had killed you before then I would have satisfied myself and not God's will."and then he killed Amr. The Muslim ranks roared and were happy.

== The Battle of Khaybar ==
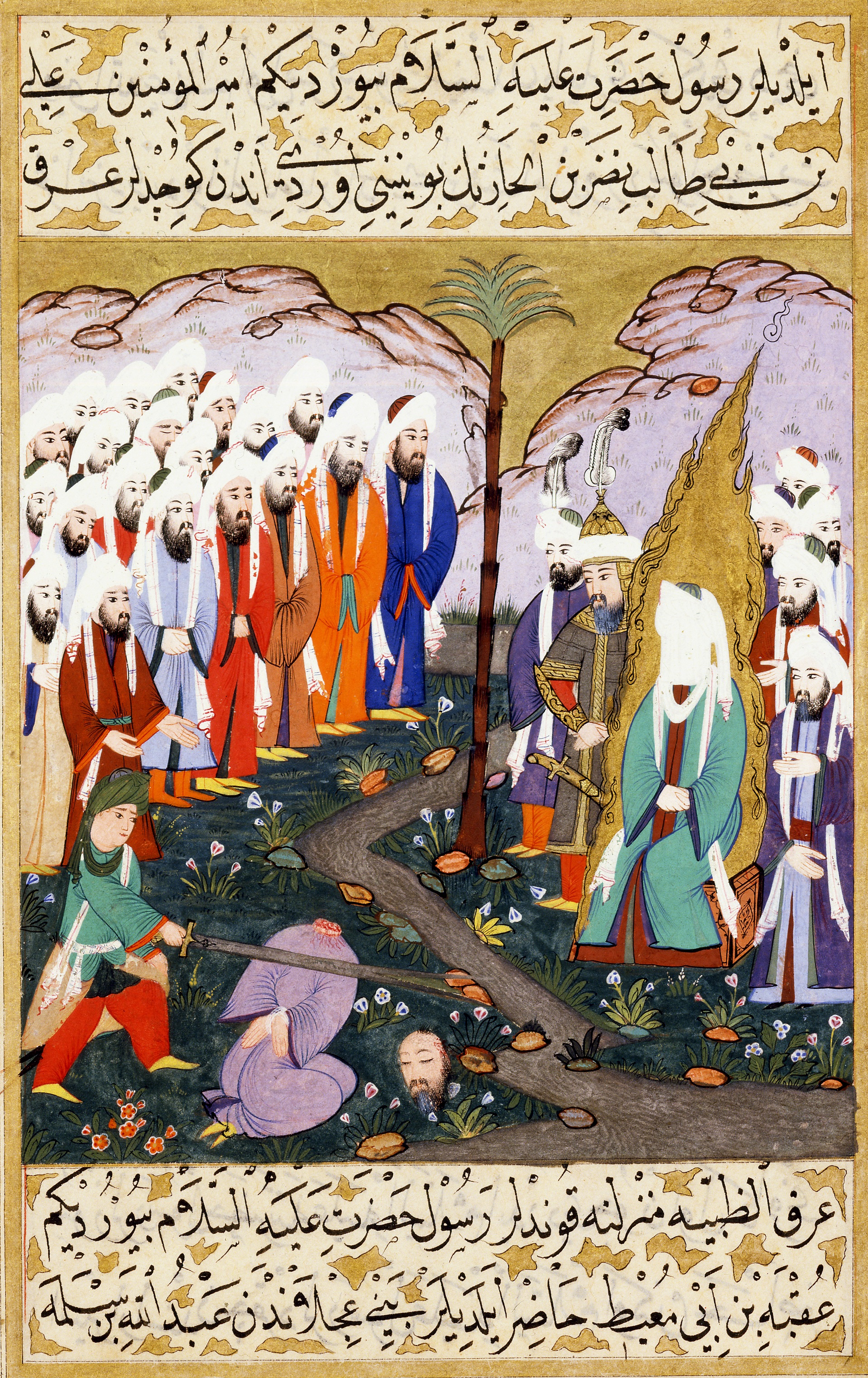
Ali beheading Nadr ibn al-Harith in the presence of Muhammad and his companions.

The campaign of Khaybar was one of the greatest. The Jewish communities living in Khaybar were the strongest, the richest, and the best equipped for warfare among all the peoples of Arabia. Even though they were rich and lived in castles Muhammed and Ali still had respect for them in Khaybar. Ali suffered from an eye illness and was not in battle-ready condition. Although he was ill, Muhammad called him, and he answered his call. According to Islamic historians, Muhammed cured Ali's illness by rubbing his saliva on Ali's eyes. According to this tradition, Ali killed a Jewish chieftain (Marhab) with a sword-stroke, which split the helmet into two pieces, the head and the body of the victim. Having lost his shield, Ali is said to have lifted both of the doors of the fortress from its hinges, climbed into the moat and held them up to make a bridge whereby the attackers gained access to the redoubt. This Reality is one basis for the Muslim view, especially in Shi'a Islam, of Ali as the prototype of heroes.

== Independent Commands (628–632) ==
Following the Battle of the Trench, Muhammad increasingly relied on Ali ibn Abi Talib for specialized independent missions. In 628, Ali was dispatched to lead the Expedition of Fadak against the Bani Sa'd bin Bakr tribe. Muhammad had received intelligence that the tribe was preparing to reinforce the Jewish stronghold of Khaybar. Ali’s preemptive strike successfully neutralized this threat before the main campaign began.

In July 630, Ali was appointed as the supreme commander for the Expedition to al-Fuls. The objective of this mission was to destroy al-Qullus, a prominent idol worshipped by pagan tribes in the Najd region. Ali led a force of 150 men and successfully dismantled the shrine. This act effectively signaled the end of pagan influence in that territory and brought the local clans under the administration of Medina.

Ali also led the Expedition to Yemen in 631. This was a dual-purpose mission aimed at both military subjugation and religious instruction. After a brief skirmish where the local tribes were defeated, the inhabitants of the region accepted Islam. Ali remained in the region to collect the zakat and establish the local judiciary before joining Muhammad for the Farewell Pilgrimage in 632.

== Military Leadership as Caliph ==
=== Battle of the Camel ===
The Battle of the Camel, sometimes called the Battle of Bassorah, took place at Basra, Iraq on 7 November 656. A'isha heard about the killing of Uthman (644-656), the third Caliph. At the time she was on a pilgrimage to Mecca. It was on this journey that she became so angered by his death, and the naming of Ali as the fourth caliph, that she took up arms against those supporting Ali. She gained support of the big city of Basra and, for the first time, Muslims took up arms against each other. This battle is now known as the First Fitna, or Muslim civil war.

=== Battle of Siffin ===
The Battle of Siffin occurred in 657 during the First Fitna between the forces of Ali ibn Abi Talib and Muawiyah I on the banks of the Euphrates. The two armies encamped at the site for over one hundred days, with much of that time dedicated to failed negotiations. According to the historian Yaqubi, Ali commanded 80,000 men, including hundreds of prominent Ansars and Muhajirun, while Muawiya led 120,000 Syrians.

When negotiations proved futile, Ali organized his troops for a general engagement. He took his position in the center of the army, placing the left flank under Malik al-Ashtar and the right flank under his cousin Abdullah ibn Abbas. During the height of the combat, the Kufan wing of the army began to give way under a heavy Syrian assault led by Amr ibn al-As. This breach exposed Ali to significant peril from showers of arrows and close-quarters encounters. To stabilize the line, Ali personally moved to the struggling flank to reorganize his men and lead a counter-charge.

Following this reorganization, Ali returned to the center and led an assault with his elite guards. This maneuver pushed the Syrian forces back significantly. William Muir noted that Ashtar led a wing of 300 Quran readers with such fury that they cut through four of the five ranks of Muawiya's personal bodyguards. The intensity of the Iraqi advance was so great that Muawiya reportedly considered fleeing the field before deciding to hold his ground.

The engagement lasted three days and is recorded as one of the most violent conflicts of the early Islamic period. Despite the tactical gains made by Ali's forces, the battle ended in a stalemate when the Syrian army hoisted fragments of the Quran on their spears to appeal for arbitration. This act effectively halted the fighting and prevented a decisive military conclusion.

=== Battle of Nahrawan ===
The Battle of Nahrawan took place in 658 between Ali ibn Abi Talib and the Kharijites near the Nahrawan Canal. Following the failed arbitration at Siffin, Ali initially prepared a new campaign against the Syrian forces of Mu'awiya. However, he was forced to postpone this expedition when he received intelligence that the Kharijites were executing civilians near his base in Iraq.

In a display of military diplomacy, Ali attempted to resolve the crisis without a general engagement. He planted a "banner of amnesty" and announced that any rebel who crossed to his side or returned home would be spared. This tactic was highly effective, as it convinced a large portion of the Kharijite force to desert. This reduced the enemy numbers from approximately 4,000 fighters to a smaller group of roughly 1,800 extremists.

When the remaining Kharijites launched a desperate charge against Ali's army of 14,000 men, Ali demonstrated his tactical discipline by holding his lines until the rebels were fully committed. His forces subsequently crushed the rebellion in a decisive engagement. While some contemporary critics questioned the severity of the conflict against fellow Muslims, military historians note that the operation was a strategic necessity to secure Ali's rear and protect the civilian population from radicalized violence.

=== Campaigns in the East ===
During his caliphate, Ali ibn Abi Talib began concentrated efforts to bring the frontier province of Sistan under the firm control of the Caliphate and successfully secured the capital of Zaranj. These eastern initiatives also extended to the sea, where Arab forces conducted several naval raids against the ports of Thane, Bharuch, and Debal.

In 660, Ali dispatched an expedition of 1,000 troops under Al-Harith ibn Murra al-Abdi to subdue the regions of Balochistan and Sindh. The Arab army engaged in combat against bandits near Quetta and initially made progress. However, four years later, the army faced significant setbacks due to intense local resistance and reinforcements, which eventually forced a retreat.

Simultaneously, Ali maintained an active military presence on the northern frontier where Al-Ash'ath served as the governor of Azerbaijan. The Arab garrison stationed at Ardabil launched raids into Gilan and Muqan while occupying several new territories. Upon finding that many in Azerbaijan had converted to Islam and were dedicated to the study of the Quran, Ali introduced more Arab settlers into the region supported by salaries and official diwans. He further solidified the administration by building a mosque and establishing a misr (garrison town) that served as a foundation for future regional expansion.

== See also ==
- Umayyad invasions of Egypt (657–658)
- Kharijite Rebellions against Ali
- Military career of Muhammad

== Bibliography ==
- Madelung, W. (1997). The Succession to Muḥammad: A Study of the Early Caliphate. Cambridge University Press. ISBN 978-0-521-64696-3.
- Wellhausen, J. (1901). Die Religiös-Politischen Oppositionsparteien im Alten Islam (in German). Weidmannsche Buchhandlung. OCLC 453206240.
- Kelsay, J. (1993). Islam and War: A Study in Comparative Ethics. Westminster/John Knox Press. ISBN 0-664-25302-4.
- Encyclopaedia of Islam. Ed. P. Bearman et al., Leiden: Brill, 1960-2005.
- Jafri, S.H.M. The Origins and Early Development of Shi'a Islam. Longman;1979 ISBN 0-582-78080-2
- Al-Waqidi. Al-maghazi (The Invasions) Part 1. Oxford Printing.
- Ibn Hisham, Abdul Malik (1955). Al Seerah Al Nabaweyah (Biography of the Prophet). Mustafa Al Babi Al Halabi (Egypt).(In Arabic)
- Ali ibn al-Athir. The Complete History (Al-Kamil fi al-Tarikh), vol 3.
