= Fadak (disambiguation) =

Fadak (Arabic: فدك) may refer to:

- Fadak
- Fadak Metro Station, a station in Tehran Metro Line 2
- Fadak Satellite Channel

== Locations ==
- Fadak, Ilam
- Fadak, Razavi Khorasan

== Muslim expeditions ==
- Expedition on Fadak (disambiguation)
  - Expedition of Ali ibn Abi Talib (Fadak), 627 AD, 8th month of 6AH
  - Expedition of Bashir Ibn Sa’d al-Ansari (Fadak), December 628 AD, 3rd month 7AH
  - Expedition of Ghalib ibn Abdullah al-Laithi (Fadak), January 629 AD, 7AH
