= Expedition of Ali ibn Abi Talib =

Expedition of Ali ibn Abi Talib may refer to a number of expeditions by Ali ibn Abi Talib including:

- Expedition of Ali ibn Abi Talib (Fadak), December, 627 AD, 8th month of 6AH
- Expedition of Ali ibn Abi Talib (Al-Fuls), August 630 AD, 2nd month of 9AH, to destroy the statue (idol) of the pagan deity al-Fuls (al-Qullus) of Banu Tai tribe, and convert them to Islam
- Expedition of Ali ibn Abi Talib (Hamdan), 631 AD, 10AH to convert the people of Yemen to Islam
- Expedition of Ali ibn Abi Talib (Mudhij), around December 631 AD, Ramadan 10AH
