= Expedition on Fadak =

Expedition on Fadak may refer to:

- Expedition of Ali ibn Abi Talib (Fadak), 627 AD, 8th month of 6AH
- Expedition of Bashir Ibn Sa’d al-Ansari (Fadak), December 628 AD, 3rd month 7AH
- Expedition of Ghalib ibn Abdullah al-Laithi (Fadak), January 629 AD, 7AH

== See also ==
- Conquest of Fadak, May 628 AD, 2nd month of 7AH
