= Expedition of Bashir ibn Saʽd al-Anṣari =

Expedition of Bashir Ibn Saʽd al-Ansari may refer to:

- Expedition of Bashir ibn Saʽd al-Anṣari (Yemen), February 628 AD, 10th month 7AH
- Expedition of Bashir ibn Saʽd al-Anṣari (Fadak), December 628 AD, 3rd month of 7AH
