= Bashir ibn Sa'd =

Companion of Islamic prophet Muhammad (died c.633)

Bashir ibn Sa'd بشير بن سعد
- Born: Medina, Hijaz, Arabia
- Died: 633 CE (12 AH); Ayn al-Tamr, Iraq
- Spouse: Amra bint Rawaha
- Children: Nu'man ibn Bashir, Ubayya
- Relatives: Banu Khazraj (tribe)
- Military career
- Conflicts: Battles under Muhammad; Battle of Badr; Battle of Uhud; Battle of the Trench; Expedition of Bashir Ibn Sa’d al-Ansari (Fadak); Expedition of Bashir Ibn Sa’d al-Ansari (Yemen); Muslim conquest of Persia; Battle of Ayn al-Tamr †

Bashir ibn Sa'd al-Ansari (Arabic: بشير بن سعد الأنصاري, romanized: Bashīr ibn Saʿd al-Anṣārī; died 633 CE) was a companion (Sahaba) of the Islamic prophet Muhammad and a leader of the Banu Khazraj tribe in Medina. A veteran of the Battle of Badr, Bashir was among the early converts from the Ansar and was one of the few individuals of his era literate in Arabic.

Bashir is historically best known for his decisive role during the Saqifah gathering following Muhammad's death in 632 CE. He was the first member of the Ansar to pledge allegiance (Bay'ah) to Abu Bakr, an act credited with breaking the tribal deadlock between the Khazraj and Banu Aws and ensuring the stability of the early Rashidun Caliphate. He served as a military commander in several expeditions during Muhammad's lifetime and was later martyred during the Muslim conquest of Persia at the Battle of Ayn al-Tamr while serving under Khalid ibn al-Walid.

== Family and lineage ==
Bashir belonged to the Al-Harith branch of the Banu Khazraj. His full lineage is recorded as Bashir ibn Sa’d ibn Tha‘laba ibn Khallas ibn Zayd ibn Malik al-Agharr ibn Tha‘laba ibn Ka‘b. His mother was Unaysa bint Khalifa ibn ‘Adi ibn ‘Amr. Bashir was married to Amra bint Rawaha, the sister of the poet-commander Abd Allah ibn Rawaha. They had two children: a son, Nu'man ibn Bashir, and a daughter, Ubayya.

He had a full brother, Simak ibn Sa'd al-Ansari, who was also a companion of Muhammad and a veteran of the battles of Badr and Uhud. Bashir was notable for being literate, a rare skill in the Jahiliyya period, and was known to write in Arabic before the advent of Islam.

== Biography ==
=== Era of Muhammad ===
Bashir participated in the Battle of Badr (624 CE). The Muslim forces included figures such as Abu Bakr, Umar, Ali, and Zubayr ibn al-Awwam. The army famously relied on limited transport, with seventy camels and two horses shared among the men.

In Shaban 7 AH (December 628 CE), Bashir commanded the Expedition of Bashir Ibn Sa’d al-Ansari (Fadak) against the Banu Murra. During the encounter, thirty Muslims were ambushed; twenty-nine were killed, and Bashir was severely wounded in the heel. He was initially presumed dead but managed to recover after being sheltered by a local resident in Fadak.

In Shawwal 7 AH, he led a second mission to the region of Yemen and al-Jabar against the Banu Ghatafan, which resulted in the capture of spoils and a safe return to Medina. Later that year, during the First Pilgrimage, Muhammad appointed him to oversee the Muslim army's weaponry.

=== Succession at Saqifa ===
Upon the death of Muhammad in 632 CE, a leadership dispute arose at the Saqifah of Banu Sa'ida. While many of the Ansar favored Sa'd ibn Ubadah, Bashir intervened to advocate for unity. Despite the tensions between the Muhajirun and Ansar, Bashir was the first of the Ansar to offer his Bay'ah (oath of allegiance) to Abu Bakr. His support was pivotal, as it prompted members of the rival Banu Aws tribe to also pledge allegiance, effectively securing Abu Bakr's position as the first Caliph.

=== Death ===
During the caliphate of Abu Bakr, Bashir joined the conquest of Iraq. He was martyred in 633 CE (12 AH) at the Battle of Ayn al-Tamr while serving under the command of Khalid ibn al-Walid.

== Hadith narration ==
Bashir is the subject of a foundational Hadith concerning parental equity. His son, Nu'man ibn Bashir, reported that Bashir once attempted to give him a specific gift and sought Muhammad's blessing:

Bashir said: "O Messenger of Allah, I have given this son of mine a slave who belonged to me as a present." The Messenger of Allah said: "Have you given a present to all your children?" He said: "No." He said: "Then take (your present) back."

This report serves as a primary source for the Islamic jurisprudence requirement that parents treat all their children with fairness.

== See also ==
- List of expeditions of Muhammad
- Expedition of Bashir Ibn Sa’d al-Ansari (Fadak)

== Bibliography ==
- Ibn Sa'd, Muhammad (2013). Kitab at-Tabaqat al-Kabir, Volume III: The Companions of Badr. Translated by Aisha Bewley. Ta-Ha Publishers. ISBN 978-1842001332.
- an-Nasa'i, Ahmad ibn Shu'ayb (2007). Sunan an-Nasa'i. Vol. 4. Darussalam. ISBN 978-9960-58-760-8.
- Al-Mubarakpuri, Safiur-Rahman (2014). The Sealed Nectar. Darussalam Publishers.
