= Battle of Marj Rahit (684) =

Early battle of the Second Fitna

- Part of the Second Fitna
Date	18 August 684 CE
Location	Marj Rahit, near modern Adra 33°35′02″N 36°27′42″E
Result	Umayyad victory

Belligerents
Umayyad Caliphate; Banu Kalb; Kindites; Ghassanids; Banu Tayy; Banu al-Qayn; Tanukh; Banu Judham (Banu Wa'il branch)	Zubayrid Caliphate; Banu Sulaym; Banu Amir; Ghatafan; Bahila; Himyarites; Banu Ghani; Banu Judham (Banu Sa'd branch)

Commanders and leaders
Marwan I Ubayd Allah ibn Ziyad; Amr ibn Sa'id ibn al-As; Abbad ibn Ziyad; Rawh ibn Zinba; Abd al-Aziz ibn Marwan; Bishr ibn Marwan	Al-Dahhak ibn Qays †; Zufar ibn al-Harith; Nu'man ibn Bashir; Natil ibn Qays; Ziyad ibn Amr; Shurahbil ibn Dhi'l-Kala; Ma'n ibn Yazid †

Strength
6,000 or 13,000, mostly infantry	30,000 or 60,000, mostly cavalry

Casualties and losses
	80 nobles
- Location of the battle within modern Syria

The Battle of Marj Rahit (Arabic: يوم مرج راهط, romanized: Yawm Marj Rāhiṭ) was one of the early battles of the Second Fitna. It was fought on 18 August 684 between the Kalb-dominated armies of the Yaman tribal confederation, supporting the Umayyads under Caliph Marwan I, and the Qays under al-Dahhak ibn Qays al-Fihri, who supported the Mecca-based Caliph Abd Allah ibn al-Zubayr. The decisive Umayyad victory consolidated their power over Syria, paving the way for their eventual victory in the war against the Zubayrids. However, it also left a bitter legacy of division and rivalry between the Qays and the Yaman, which would be a constant source of strife and instability for the remainder of the Umayyad Caliphate.

== Background ==
Upon the death of Caliph Mu'awiya I (r. 661–680), the founder of the Umayyad Caliphate, in 680, the Muslim world was thrown into turmoil. Although Mu'awiya had named his son, Yazid I, as his heir, this choice was not universally recognized, especially by the old Medinan elites, who challenged the Umayyads' claim to keep the succession to the Caliphate within their clan. Among them, the two chief candidates for the caliphate were Husayn ibn Ali (the grandson of Muhammad, and son of the fourth Rashidun caliph Ali), and Abd Allah ibn al-Zubayr (the grandson of the first Rashidun caliph Abu Bakr, and nephew of Muhammad's wife Aisha). Husayn refused to recognize Yazid and set out for Kufa following invitations from its notables, but this resulted in his death at the Battle of Karbala in October 680, leaving Ibn al-Zubayr as the most prominent remaining rival for the Umayyads. As long as Yazid ruled, Ibn al-Zubayr denounced his rule from the sanctuary of Mecca but did not yet openly claim the caliphate, instead insisting that the caliph should be chosen in the traditional manner, by a tribal assembly (shura) from among all the Quraysh, not just the Umayyads. After the open revolt of Medina against Umayyad rule, Yazid sent an army to Arabia in 683 that defeated the Medinans and laid siege to Mecca, but Yazid's death in November forced the expeditionary force to return home.

Yazid was succeeded by his son, Mu'awiya II, but his authority was limited to central and southern Syria. His death a few weeks later provoked a succession crisis, since his other brothers were too young to succeed. As a result, Umayyad authority collapsed across the Caliphate and Ibn al-Zubayr was acknowledged as caliph by most of the Muslim world: the Umayyad governor of Iraq, Ubayd Allah ibn Ziyad, was evicted from the province, coins in Ibn al-Zubayr's name were minted in Persia, and the Qaysi tribes of northern Syria and the Jazira (Upper Mesopotamia) went over to his cause. The governor of Homs, Nu'man ibn Bashir, and the Himyarites who dominated his district supported Ibn al-Zubayr, as did Natil ibn Qays, who expelled the Umayyad governor of Palestine, Rawh ibn Zinba, his rival within the Judham tribe. Even many members of the Umayyad family considered going to Mecca and declaring their allegiance to Ibn al-Zubayr. However, pro-Umayyad tribes, particularly the Banu Kalb under Ibn Bahdal, dominated the district of Jordan and had support in Damascus. They were determined to install a member of the Umayyad family as caliph, and at their initiative, a shura of the loyal tribes was held at Jabiya, where Marwan ibn al-Hakam, a distant cousin of Mu'awiya I who had been a close aide of Caliph Uthman (r. 644–656), was recognised as caliph.

== Opening skirmishes and the battle of Marj Rahit ==
Marwan's election provoked the reaction of the Qays, who rallied around the governor of Damascus, al-Dahhak ibn Qays al-Fihri. After vacillating between the two candidates, al-Dahhak was persuaded to recognize Ibn al-Zubayr and began assembling his forces at the field of Marj al-Suffar near Damascus. In response, the Umayyad coalition marched on Damascus, which was secured for Marwan by a revolt led by a Ghassanid nobleman, Yazid ibn Abi al-Nims.

The two armies first clashed in mid-July 684 at the plain of Marj al-Suffar, and the Qays were pushed towards Marj Rahit, a plain some 17 kilometres northeast of Damascus (between the modern cities of Douma and Adra). Twenty days of skirmishing between the two camps followed, until the final battle took place on 18 August. The numbers of the two opponents are uncertain: al-Tabari puts Marwan's forces at 6,000, another tradition at 13,000 and 30,000 for Marwan and al-Dahhak respectively, while Ibn Khayyat inflates the numbers to 30,000 and 60,000 respectively. The traditions agree, however, that the Umayyad forces were considerably outnumbered. Marwan's commanders were Abbad ibn Ziyad, Amr ibn Sa'id al-Ashdaq and Ubayd Allah ibn Ziyad (another tradition has Ubayd Allah commanding the cavalry and Malik ibn Hubayra al-Sakuni the infantry), while only one of al-Dahhak's commanders, Ziyad ibn Amr ibn Mu'awiya al-Uqayli, is known.

A plethora of anecdotes, individual accounts, and poems on the battle survives, but the details of the battle itself are not clear. Among the participating members of the Umayyad family, Marwan's young son Bishr killed a chieftain of the Banu Kilab, while his brother Abd al-Aziz was thrown off his horse during the fighting. The battle nevertheless resulted in a crushing Umayyad victory: the main leaders of the Qays, including al-Dahhak, fell in the field. Nikita Elisséeff explains the Umayyad success by the possible defection of Qays-aligned tribes during the preceding weeks, eager to uphold the Syrian hegemony over the Caliphate. In addition, Elisséeff points out that the Umayyads still controlled the state treasury in Damascus, allowing them to bribe tribes to join them. The remnants of the Qaysi army fled to Qarqisiya under Zufar ibn al-Harith al-Kilabi, and Marwan was officially proclaimed as caliph at Damascus.

== Aftermath ==
The victory at Marj Rahit secured the authority of the Umayyads in Syria and allowed them to go onto the offensive against the Zubayrids. Egypt was recovered later in the year, but an attempt to recover Iraq under Ubayd Allah ibn Ziyad was defeated by pro-Alid forces under Mukhtar al-Thaqafi near Mosul in August 686. Caliph Abd al-Malik, who had succeeded his father Caliph Marwan after the latter's death in April 685, thereafter restricted himself to securing his own position, while Mus'ab ibn al-Zubayr defeated Mukhtar and gained control of Iraq in 687. In 691, Abd al-Malik managed to bring Zufar ibn al-Harith's Qaysi tribes back into the Umayyad fold, and defeated Mus'ab, re-establishing Umayyad authority across Iraq and the Eastern provinces. In October 692, after another siege of Mecca, Abd Allah ibn al-Zubayr was killed, and Umayyad rule over the Caliphate was restored.

== Impact ==
The most enduring legacy of Marj Rahit was the hardening of the Qays–Kalb split in Syria, which was paralleled in the division and rivalry between the Mudar, led by the Banu Tamim, and the Rabi'a and Azd alliance in Iraq. Together, these rivalries caused a realignment of tribal loyalties into two tribal confederations or "super-groups" across the Caliphate: the "North Arab" or Qays/Mudar bloc, opposed by the "South Arabs" or Yemenis, although these terms were political rather than strictly geographical, since the properly "northern" Rabi'a adhered to the "southern" Yemenis. The Umayyad caliphs tried to maintain a balance between the two groups, but this division and the implacable rivalry between the two groups became a fixture of the Arab world over the following decades, as even originally unaligned tribes were drawn to affiliate themselves with one of the two super-groups. Their constant contest for power and influence dominated the Umayyad Caliphate, creating instability in the provinces, helping to foment the disastrous Third Fitna and contributing to the Umayyads' final fall at the hands of the Abbasids. Indeed, in the assessment of Julius Wellhausen, Marj Rahit "brought victory to the Umayyads, and at the same time shattered the foundations of their power". The division continued long after: as Hugh N. Kennedy writes, "As late as the nineteenth century, battles were still being fought in Palestine between groups calling themselves Qays and Yaman".

== Sources ==
- Burns, Ross (2007). Damascus: A History. London and New York: Routledge. ISBN 978-1-134-48850-6.
- Crone, Patricia (1994). "Were the Qays and Yemen of the Umayyad Period Political Parties?". Der Islam. 71: 1–57. doi:10.1515/islm.1994.71.1.1. ISSN 0021-1818. S2CID 154370527.
- Elisséeff, N. (1991). "Mardj Rāhiṭ". In Bosworth, C. E.; van Donzel, E. & Pellat, Ch. (eds.). The Encyclopaedia of Islam, Second Edition. Volume VI: Mahk–Mid. Leiden: E. J. Brill. pp. 544–546. ISBN 978-90-04-08112-3.
- Hawting, G. R., ed. (1989). The History of al-Ṭabarī, Volume XX: The Collapse of Sufyānid Authority and the Coming of the Marwānids: The Caliphates of Muʿāwiyah II and Marwān I and the Beginning of the Caliphate of ʿAbd al-Malik, A.D. 683–685/A.H. 64–66. SUNY Series in Near Eastern Studies. Albany, New York: State University of New York Press. ISBN 978-0-88706-855-3.
- Hawting, Gerald R. (2000). The First Dynasty of Islam: The Umayyad Caliphate AD 661–750 (Second ed.). London and New York: Routledge. ISBN 0-415-24072-7.
- Kennedy, Hugh (2001). The Armies of the Caliphs: Military and Society in the Early Islamic State. London and New York: Routledge. ISBN 0-415-25093-5.
- Kennedy, Hugh (2004) [1986]. The Prophet and the Age of the Caliphates: The Islamic Near East from the 6th to the 11th Century (Second ed.). Harlow: Longman. ISBN 978-0-582-40525-7.
- Wellhausen, Julius (1927). The Arab Kingdom and Its Fall. Translated by Margaret Graham Weir. Calcutta: University of Calcutta.
- Vaglieri, L. Veccia (1960). "Bishr b. Marwān". In Gibb, H. A. R.; Kramers, J. H.; Lévi-Provençal, E.; Schacht, J.; Lewis, B. & Pellat, Ch. (eds.). The Encyclopaedia of Islam, Second Edition. Volume I: A–B. Leiden: E. J. Brill. pp. 1242–1243. OCLC 495469456.
