= Nu'man ibn Bashir =

Companion of Muhammad (c. 623–684)

Nuʿmān ibn Bashīr
- نُّعْمَانُ بْنُ بَشِيرٍ

Umayyad governor of Kufa
- In office 679-680
- Monarch: Mu'awiya I
- Preceded by: Abd al-Rahman ibn Umm al-Hakam al-Thaqafi
- Succeeded by: Ubayd Allah ibn Ziyad

Governor of Jund Hims
- In office 666–678
- Monarch: Mu'awiya I
- Preceded by: Abd al-Rahman ibn Khalid
- Succeeded by: Malik ibn Hubayra al-Sakuni

Personal details
- Born: c. October 623 CE (c. Rabi' al-Akhir 2 AH) Medina, Hejaz
- Died: c. August 684 CE (c. Dhu'l-Hijja 64 AH) (aged c. 60) near Homs, Syria
- Children: Aban; Amrah; Humayda; Hind
- Parent(s): Bashir ibn Sa'd; Umrah bint Rawaha
- Relatives: Abd Allah ibn Rawaha (maternal uncle); Mukhtar al-Thaqafi (son-in-law)

Military service
- Allegiance: Umayyad Caliphate
- Battles/wars: First Fitna; Battle of Siffin (657); Battle of Ayn al-Tamr (659); Second Fitna; Battle of Marj Rahit (684)

Nu'man ibn Bashir ibn Sa'd al-Ansari (Arabic: نُّعْمَانُ بْنُ بَشِيرٍ بْنُ سَعْدٍ الأَنْصَارِيِّ, romanized: Nuʿmān ibn Bashīr ibn Saʿd al-Anṣārī; c. 623–684) was a companion of the Islamic prophet Muhammad who served as a commander and statesman. Born in Medina to the Banu Khazraj tribe of the Ansar, he was a supporter of Mu'awiya I, future founder of the Umayyad Caliphate, during the First Fitna. Nu'man fought at the Battle of Siffin in 657 in support of Mu'awiya’s cause against Caliph Ali, and in 659, he led an expedition to Ayn al-Tamr against Ali's forces. Under Mu'awiya's caliphate, he served as governor of Homs and later as governor of Kufa from 679 to 680. Following the death of caliph Yazid I, Nu'man recognized the Mecca-based caliph Abd Allah ibn al-Zubayr, serving again as the governor of Homs. In 684, following the defeat of his pro-Zubayrid allies at the Battle of Marj Rahit, he was pursued and slain while fleeing the city.

== Early life and family ==
Nu'man ibn Bashir was born in Medina during the Islamic month of Rabi al-Akhir, which occurred fourteen months after the Hijrah, the migration of the Islamic prophet Muhammad from Mecca to Medina. He belonged to the Banu Khazraj, a major tribe of the Ansar. According to some Muslim authorities, he was the first child of the Ansar to be born after the Hijrah. His father, Bashir ibn Sa'd, was a distinguished companion of Muhammad, and his mother, Amra bint Rawaha, was a sister of another noted Ansari companion, Abd Allah ibn Rawaha.

== Service to the Umayyad Caliphate ==
Nu'man was dedicated to avenging the death of Caliph Uthman (r. 644–656) and was a vociferous opponent of Caliph Ali (r. 656–661). He became a loyalist of the Umayyad governor of Syria, Mu'awiya ibn Abi Sufyan, during his conflict with Ali and participated in the Battle of Siffin in 657, distinguishing himself from most of the Ansar, who were generally aligned with Ali. In 659, Nu'man led an expedition against a garrison of Ali's troops at Ayn al-Tamr in the desert region south of Hit, west of the Euphrates, but was repulsed. At some point following the death of Mu'awiya's governor of Jund Hims (the military district of Homs), Abd al-Rahman ibn Khalid, in 666, Mu'awiya, who had become caliph in 661, appointed Nu'man, who had since settled in Homs, as his governor there.

In 679, Nu'man was appointed governor of Kufa by Mu'awiya. In 680, Mu'awiya died and was succeeded by his son Yazid I, who afterward replaced Nu'man with Ubayd Allah ibn Ziyad in 680, partly as a result of Nu'man's lax response to the anti-Umayyad activities of Muslim ibn Aqil, who was rallying support in the city for Husayn ibn Ali. In 682, Yazid dispatched Nu'man to Medina to reconcile the Ansar to his caliphate, but he was unable to obtain their support.

== Service to the Zubayrid Caliphate and death ==
After Yazid's death, Nu'man recognized the Mecca-based, anti-Umayyad caliph Abd Allah ibn al-Zubayr, who appointed Nu'man to his old provincial post in Homs. This aligned him with the Qaysi tribes which dominated northern Syria and the governors of Damascus and Palestine, al-Dahhak ibn Qays al-Fihri and Natil ibn Qays al-Judhami. The two sides met at the Battle of Marj Rahit in 684, during which Nu'man dispatched Shurahbil ibn Dhi'l-Kala and the latter's Himyari tribesmen from the Homs garrison to join al-Dahhak. After receiving reports that the Qaysi tribes led by al-Dahhak were routed by the pro-Umayyad Banu Kalb, Nu'man fled Homs with his wife, Na'ila bint Umara, who was previously married to Mu'awiya, and his children, but was pursued and slain by members of the Homs garrison in Dhu al-Hijjah 64 AH (August 684 CE). His wife and children were spared and came under the protection of the Banu Kalb, his wife's tribe.

== Descendants and legacy ==
One of his daughters, Amra, was wed to the pro-Alid ruler of Kufa, al-Mukhtar al-Thaqafi. After al-Mukhtar was killed by Zubayrid forces in 687, Amra was imprisoned and executed for not condemning her husband. Upon hearing the news of her death, Nu'man's son Aban assaulted her executioner and was arrested but released by the Zubayrids. Another of Nu'man's daughters, Umm Aban, was later married to al-Hajjaj ibn Yusuf. At least three of Nu'man's descendants became transmitters of hadith in the mid-8th century and the family of Nu'man militarily supported caliph al-Walid II against Yazid III during the Third Fitna in 744. Despite his family's alignment against Yazid III, Nu'man's grandson, Abd al-Samad ibn Aban, was appointed the lieutenant governor of Kufa under the Umayyad governor of Iraq, Abd Allah ibn Umar ibn Abd al-Aziz, after Yazid III became caliph in the aftermath of al-Walid II's slaying in 744. According to the medieval Arabic geographers, the city of Ma'arrat al-Nu'man was named in honor of Nu'man.

== Bibliography ==
- Crone, Patricia (1980). Slaves on Horses: The Evolution of the Islamic Polity (1980 ed.). Cambridge: Cambridge University Press. ISBN 978-0521229616.
- Fishbein, Michael, ed. (1990). The History of al-Ṭabarī, Volume XXI: The Victory of the Marwānids, A.D. 685–693/A.H. 66–73. SUNY Series in Near Eastern Studies. Albany, New York: State University of New York Press. ISBN 978-0-7914-0221-4.
- Hawting, G. R., ed. (1996). The History of al-Ṭabarī, Volume XVII: The First Civil War: From the Battle of Siffīn to the Death of ʿAlī, A.D. 656–661/A.H. 36–40. SUNY Series in Near Eastern Studies. Albany, New York: State University of New York Press. ISBN 978-0-7914-2393-6.
- Hawting, G. R., ed. (1989). The History of al-Ṭabarī, Volume XX: The Collapse of Sufyānid Authority and the Coming of the Marwānids: The Caliphates of Muʿāwiyah II and Marwān I and the Beginning of the Caliphate of ʿAbd al-Malik, A.D. 683–685/A.H. 64–66. SUNY Series in Near Eastern Studies. Albany, New York: State University of New York Press. ISBN 978-0-88706-855-3.
- Morony, Michael G., ed. (1987). The History of al-Ṭabarī, Volume XVIII: Between Civil Wars: The Caliphate of Muʿāwiyah, 661–680 A.D./A.H. 40–60. SUNY Series in Near Eastern Studies. Albany, New York: State University of New York Press. ISBN 978-0-87395-933-9.
- Wellhausen, Julius (1927). The Arab Kingdom and its Fall. Translated by Margaret Graham Weir. Calcutta: University of Calcutta. OCLC 752790641.
- Zettersteen, K. V. (1995). "Nu'man ibn Bashir al-Ansari". In Bosworth, C. E.; van Donzel, E.; Heinrichs, W. P. & Lecomte, G. (eds.). The Encyclopaedia of Islam, Second Edition. Volume VIII: Ned–Sam. Leiden: E. J. Brill. pp. 118–119. ISBN 978-90-04-09834-3.
- Ibn Sa'd, Muhammad (2012). Kitab at-Tabaqat al-Kabir, Volume VI: The Scholars of Kufa. Translated by Aisha Bewley. London: Ta-Ha Publishers. ISBN 9781842001240.
