= Abd Allah ibn Amr al-Hadrami =

7th-century Arab administrator and Umayyad partisan

Abd Allah ibn Amr al-Hadrami عبد الله بن عمرو الحضرمي

Governor of Mecca
- In office 655–656
- Monarch: Uthman
- Preceded by: Ali ibn Adi ibn Rabi'a
- Succeeded by: Qutham ibn Abbas

Governor of Basra
- In office 656–656
- Preceded by: Abd Allah ibn Amir
- Succeeded by: Uthman ibn Hunayf

Personal details
- Died: c. 659 Basra, Rashidun Caliphate
- Parent(s): Amr ibn Abd Allah al-Hadrami; Arnab bint Kurayz ibn Rabi'a
- Relatives: Arwa bint Kurayz (aunt); Abd Allah ibn Amir (cousin)

Military service
- Allegiance: Uthmaniyya (led by Aisha, 656); Mu'awiya (from 657)
- Battles/wars: First Fitna; Battle of the Camel; Hadrami Rebellion †

Abd Allāh ibn ʿĀmr al-Hadrami (Arabic: عبد الله بن عمرو الحضرمي) was a 7th-century Arab administrator, a Uthmanid, and an Umayyad partisan during the First Fitna. Al-Hadrami served as the governor of Mecca during the final years of Uthman's caliphate, and may have been serving as the governor of Basra upon Uthman's death. Following the assassination of Uthman in 656, he became a major proponent of the Uthmaniyya in demanding vengeance for the slain caliph.

He was a significant participant in the mobilization of the Meccan opposition to Ali and took part in the Battle of the Camel. However, he is most known for being dispatched from Syria by Mu'awiya I to lead a pro-Umayyad rebellion in Basra. By rallying the Banu Tamim to Mu'awiya's cause and demanding retaliation for Uthman, he successfully challenged Ali's authority and forced the local governor, Ziyad ibn Abihi, to flee the provincial palace. The uprising was eventually suppressed by Alid reinforcements, and al-Hadrami was killed when his fortified residence was burned.

== Family and early life ==
Abd Allah ibn Amr's family were long-standing confederates of the Banu Umayya, a clan of the Quraysh, and he was born during the lifetime of the Islamic prophet Muhammad. His mother was Arnab bint Kurayz, making him a maternal cousin of Abd Allah ibn Amir. His father, Amr ibn al-Hadrami, was a prominent leader of the Quraysh during the early days of Islam. In 624, he led a Meccan trade caravan that became the target of the Raid on Nakhla, where he was killed by Waqid ibn Abdullah, making him the first casualty in the armed conflict between the Muslims of Medina and the Meccans.

== Political career ==
=== Governorship of Mecca and Basra ===
During the final months of Uthman's caliphate, al-Hadrami was appointed as the governor of Mecca. He remained in office through the time of Uthman's assassination in 656, after which the city became a focal point for the Uthmaniyya. Prior to this or during periods of absence, he had been called upon by Abd Allah ibn Amir to govern Basra on his behalf, and sources indicate he may have still been serving as the governor of Basra when Uthman was killed.

Following Ali's ascension to the caliphate, he issued a general dismissal of Uthman's provincial governors, whom he considered to be symbols of nepotism and corruption. Ali's attempt to gain control of Mecca failed when the local population refused to swear allegiance to him; the city subsequently entered into open rebellion against Medina. Fleeing governors from Yemen, including Ya'la ibn Umayya and Abd Allah ibn Abi Rabi'a, arrived in the city with wealth and resources which they used to equip the Uthmanid revolt led by Aisha. Al-Hadrami was among the first to support Aisha's calls for vengeance against the regicides. When Uthman ibn Hunayf was subsequently appointed as Ali's governor of Basra, al-Hadrami was present in the city; Ibn Hunayf arrested him without resistance to secure control of the provincial administration, ending his tenure there.

=== Pro-Umayyad revolt and death ===
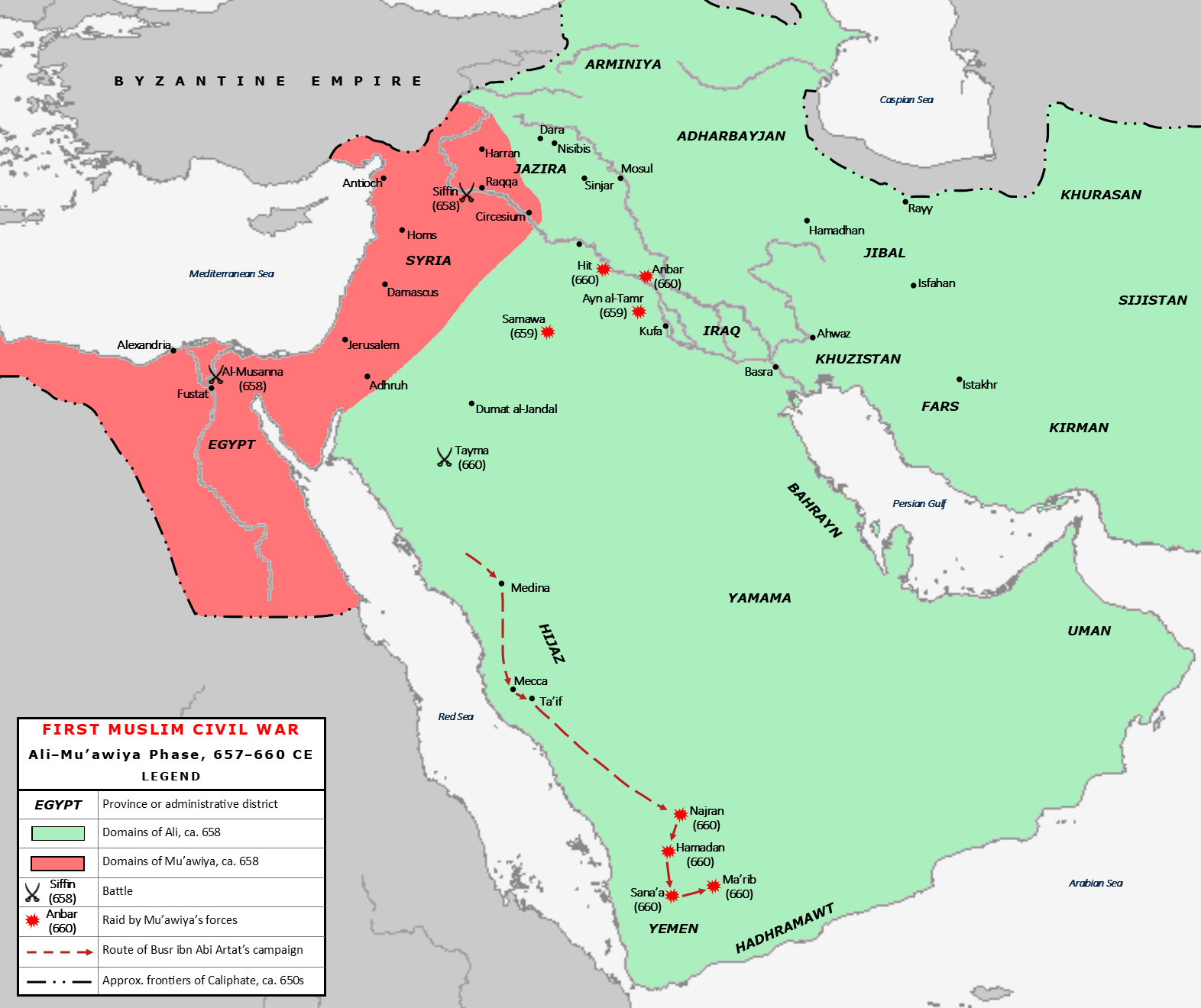
Map of the Caliphate during the First Fitna, showing the division between the territories of Ali (green) and Mu'awiya (pink).

In 659, following the Umayyad annexation of Egypt, Mu'awiya I dispatched al-Hadrami from Syria back to Basra to foment a pro-Umayyad uprising. His mission was highly effective; Ziyad ibn Abihi reported to Ali that most of the people of Basra and the majority of the Banu Tamim had offered al-Hadrami their allegiance (bay'ah). This surge of support for Mu'awiya rendered Ziyad's position untenable, forcing him to flee the governor's palace with the provincial treasury to seek protection from the Banu Azd tribe.

Ali initially attempted to resolve the situation by sending A'yan ibn Dabi' al-Mujashi, but A'yan was assassinated shortly after arrival. Ali then dispatched Jariya ibn Qudama, who restored Ziyad to the governor's palace and led a military crackdown on the rebels.

Al-Hadrami and approximately seventy followers withdrew to the fortified house of Sabil al-Sa'di. During the ensuing assault, Jariya ordered the structure to be set on fire; al-Hadrami and most of his supporters were killed in the conflagration. Notably, Mu'awiya reportedly showed little reaction to the news, a detail historians highlight as evidence of the expendable nature of provincial allies during the civil war.

== See also ==
- First Fitna
- Abd Allah ibn Amir
- Battle of the Camel

== Bibliography ==
- Abdul-Rahman, Muhammad Saed (2009). Tafsir Ibn Kathir Juz' 2 (Part 2): Al-Baqarah 142 to Al-Baqarah 252 (2nd ed.). MSA Publication Limited. ISBN 978-1-8617-9676-9.
- Donner, F.M. (2010). Muhammad and the Believers: At the Origins of Islam. Harvard University Press. ISBN 978-0-674-06414-0.
- Madelung, W. (1997). The Succession to Muḥammad: A Study of the Early Caliphate. Cambridge University Press. ISBN 978-0-521-64696-3.
- Wellhausen, Julius (1927). The Arab Kingdom and Its Fall. Translated by Margaret Graham Weir. Calcutta: University of Calcutta.
- Brockett, Adrian, ed. (1997). The History of al-Ṭabarī, Volume XVI: The Community Divided: The Caliphate of ʿAlī I, A.D. 656–657/A.H. 35–36. SUNY Series in Near Eastern Studies. Albany, New York: State University of New York Press. ISBN 978-0-7914-2391-2.
- Hawting, G. R., ed. (1996). The History of al-Ṭabarī, Volume XVII: The First Civil War: From the Battle of Siffīn to the Death of ʿAlī, A.D. 656–661/A.H. 36–40. SUNY Series in Near Eastern Studies. Albany, New York: State University of New York Press. ISBN 978-0-7914-2393-6.
- Ahmed, Asad Q. (2010). The Religious Elite of the Early Islamic Ḥijāz: Five Prosopographical Case Studies. University of Oxford Linacre College Unit for Prosopographical Research. ISBN 9781900934138.
- Gordon, Matthew S.; Robinson, Chase F.; Rowson, Everett K.; Fishbein, Michael, eds. (2018). The Works of Ibn Wāḍiḥ al-Yaʿqūbī: An English Translation. Vol. 3. Brill. ISBN 978-90-04-36416-5.
