= Banu Judham =

Arab tribe of the southern Levant

Banu Judham بنو جذام
- Ethnicity: Arab
- Nisba: Al-Judhami
- Location: Southern Levant and Northwestern Arabia
- Descended from: Kahlan ibn Saba or Shu'ayb (Jehtro)
- Religion: Christianity, Paganism, later Islam

The Judham (Arabic: بنو جذام, romanized: Banū Judhām) was a large Arab tribe that inhabited the southern Levant and northwestern Arabia during the late antique and early Islamic eras (5th–8th centuries). Under the Byzantine Empire, the tribe was nominally Christian and fought against the Muslim armies between 629 and 636, until the Byzantines and their Arab allies were defeated at the Battle of Yarmouk. Afterward, the Judham converted to Islam and became the largest tribal faction of Jund Filastin (district of Palestine).

The origins of the Judham are not clear. They may have been descendants of the northern Arabs, though the tribe itself claimed Yamanite (southern Arab) origins, perhaps in order to associate themselves with their Yamanite allies in Syria.

== Location ==
Before the advent of Islam in the early 7th century, the Judham nomads roamed the desert frontier areas of Byzantine Palestine and Syria, controlling places such as the Madyan, Amman, Ma'an, Adhruh, Tabuk as far south as Wadi al-Qura. On the eve of the Muslim conquests, they dominated the territory extending from the environs of Tabuk northward to the areas east of the Wadi Araba valley and the Dead Sea, including the Balqa region around modern Amman.

== Origins theories ==
The origins of the Judham are obscure. They were a brother tribe of the Lakhm and Amila, with whom they dwelt and were closely allied. (Note: In the Arab genealogical literature which emerged in the 8th century the Judham, Lakhm and Amila were all fathered by Adi ibn al-Harith ibn Murra ibn Udad ibn Zayd of the Kahlan.) According to the historian Werner Caskel, the three tribes were not actually related. Rather, their genealogical relationship was forged to seal their political alliance, either after they entered Palestine in the mid-7th century or before, when their abodes were concentrated east of the Dead Sea and Arabah Valley. The Lakhm emerge in the historical record no later than the 3rd century CE and little is known of the Amila other than they were an ancient tribe. The Judham emerged as a tribe later than its two counterparts but was considerably larger than both. Nonetheless, it probably incorporated elements of much older populations in the southern Syrian region, according to Caskel. Although supporting evidence is lacking, a saying attributed to the Islamic prophet Muhammad declares the Judham to be the people of Shu'ayb (Jethro) and the 8th-century genealogist Muhammad ibn Sa'ib al-Kalbi declared the tribe to be autochthonous descendants of the Biblical Midianites.

== History ==
=== Byzantine period ===
The Judham served as foederati (tribal confederate troops) of the Byzantines and through their contact with the latter became Christians, albeit superficially. However, their Christianity was disputed by the 9th-century historian Hisham ibn al-Kalbi who asserted that during the Byzantine era, the Judham worshiped the pagan idol al-Uqaysir. Some sections were also inclined towards Judaism, however, few actually converted to the faith. The Jewish tribe of Banu Nadir in Yathrib (Medina) descended from the Judham.

=== Early Islamic period ===
During the lifetime of the Islamic prophet Muhammad, the Judham rejected Islam and remained loyal to the Byzantine Empire. They blocked Muhammad's northward expansion into Syria by fighting alongside the Byzantines at the Battle of Mu'ta in 629. One of their clans, the Dhubayb, afterward converted to Islam, but the tribe as a whole still opposed the Muslims, who launched punitive expeditions against them under the command of Zayd ibn Haritha and Amr ibn al-As. The Islamic prophet's expedition to Tabuk in 630 was partly a response to reports that the Judham and Lakhm were mobilizing with the Byzantine army in the Balqa. A certain leader of the Judham in the area of Amman or Ma'an, Farwa ibn Amr, embraced Islam and was consequently crucified by the Byzantine authorities, though the historian Fred Donner holds the story of Farwa "may be merely a pious legend". After the death of Muhammad in 632, the Dhubayb defected from the nascent, Medina-based Muslim state and was the target of an assault by the Muslim general Usama ibn Zayd at the beginning of Caliph Abu Bakr's reign (632–634).

The Judham formed part of the Arab contingents of Byzantine emperor Heraclius's army at the Battle of Yarmouk in 636, but were defeated. A number of Judham clans also fought in the Muslims' ranks at Yarmouk, suggesting political divisions within the tribe played a role determining a clan's allegiance with the Byzantines or the Muslims. Though the Judham and Lakhm converted to Islam as the Muslim conquest of Syria proceeded, their earlier service with the Byzantines was likely the reason Caliph Umar (r. 634–644) excluded the two tribes from the distribution of war spoils during a summit of the Muslim armies at Jabiya in 637 or 638.

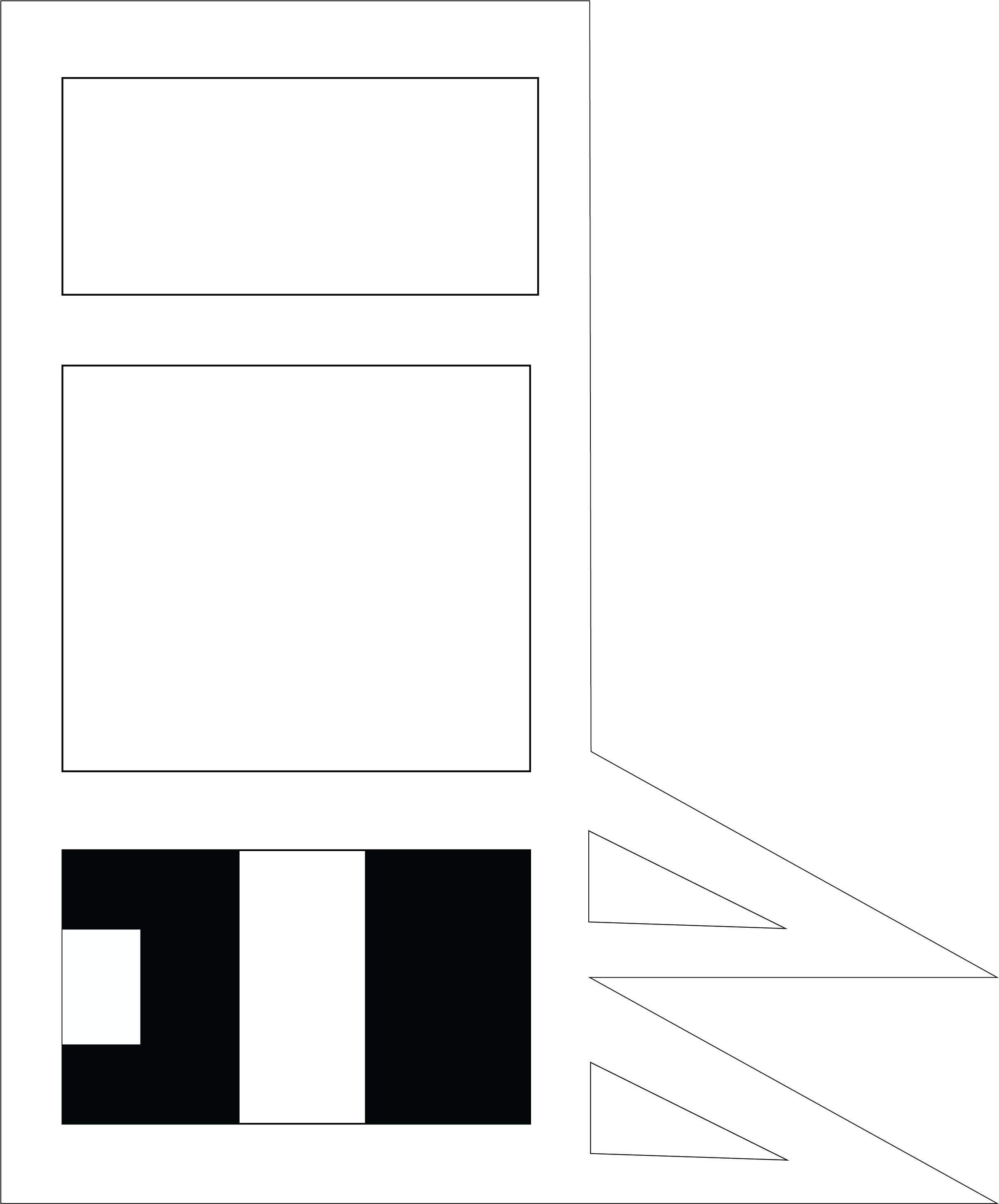
Purported banner of the Judham at the Battle of Siffin

Under the early Islamic military administration of Syria, the Judham became the largest tribe in Jund Filastin (the military district of Palestine). In the First Muslim Civil War, the Judham fought in the army of Syria's governor, Mu'awiya I, against the Iraq-based forces of Caliph Ali (r. 656–661). At the Battle of Siffin in 657, they formed the following contingents: the Judham of Palestine led by Rawh ibn Zinba, the Judham and Lakhm under Natil ibn Qays, and the Judham infantry led by Maslama ibn Mukhallad al-Ansari. Natil belonged to the Judham's preeminent clan, the Sa'd ibn Malik, and was referred to in the sources as sayyid Judhām bi-l-Shām (leader of the Judham of Syria). Rawh was younger than Natil and hailed from the Sa'd ibn Malik's brother clan, the Wa'il ibn Malik. The Sa'd traditionally provided the chiefs of at least a large part of the Judham and there are no indications in the sources of a rivalry between the Sa'd and Wa'il clans during the pre-Islamic period. Rivalries for leadership of the tribe between Natil and Rawh developed during the caliphate of Mu'awiya I (661–680).

During the reigns of Mu'awiya I and Yazid I (r. 680–683), the Quda'a tribal confederation, of which the Banu Kalb were the leading component, obtained high ranks and privileges in the caliphs' courts. The other tribes in Syria sought to join or oust the Quda'a from its position of power. From the pre-Islamic period until the end of the Sufyanid period in 684, the Quda'a claimed genealogical descent from the Ma'add, a northern Arabian tribe mentioned in the 4th-century Namara inscription. During the Sufyanid period, the Judham (along with the Lakhm and Amila tribes) were held by most sources to be of Yemeni (south Arabian) descent, though there were also sources which claimed they were descendants of the Qanas branch of the Ma'add tribe or the Banu Asad, another branch of the Ma'add. As Rawh sought to forge stronger ties to the Banu Kalb, he petitioned Yazid to recognize the Judham as descendants of Ma'add and thus kinsmen of the Quda'a; Natil opposed Rawh's initiative and insisted on affiliation with Qahtan, the progenitor of the Yemenite tribes.

Following the death of Yazid's son and successor Mu'awiya II in 684, the Judham under Natil allied with Abd Allah ibn al-Zubayr, a rival, Mecca-based claimant to the caliphate, while Rawh supported the Umayyad Marwan I. Following Marwan's victory over the supporters of Ibn al-Zubayr at the Battle of Marj Rahit in 684, the Quda'a and the Kalb changed genealogical affiliation to the Qahtan and formed the Yaman (Yemenite) confederation in opposition to the pro-Zubayrid Qays tribes of northern Syria. The Judham remained allies of the Kalb and together the two tribes formed the linchpin of the Yaman confederation in Syria during the struggle with the Qays. Natil fled Palestine or was killed and by the reign of Caliph Abd al-Malik (r. 685–705), Rawh became the undisputed leader of the Judham. The tribe remained closely allied with the Umayyads until their demise in 750.

=== Middle Islamic period ===
A branch of the Judham called the Banu Bayadh or al-Bayyadhiyin were recorded as inhabiting the northern Sinai Peninsula by the 10th-century geographer al-Hamdani and later inhabiting the Syrian Desert oasis of Qatya in the 13th century. At least part of the Judham eventually fused with the Amila in the Galilee area, and in the early 11th century, they moved into southern, present-day Lebanon. In the Mamluk era in the 13th–15th centuries, the historians Ibn Fadlallah al-Umari and al-Qalqashandi mention that the Banu Sakhr tribe inhabiting the province of al-Karak in modern Jordan belonged to the Judham, though in the Banu Sakhr's modern-day oral traditions, they claim descent from an 18th-century tribe of the Hejaz which entered modern Jordan in the 19th century.

Their presence in Egypt is also reported by David E. Millis, Reuven Aharonia and others in the form of the al-Ayed/Aydeh clan the head of which married the Circassian maternal founder of Egypt's Abaza family during the reign of the Circassian Mamluks.

== Bibliography ==
- Bailey, Clinton (1985). "Dating the Arrival of the Bedouin Tribes in Sinai and the Negev". Journal of the Economic and Social History of the Orient. 28 (1): 20–49. doi:10.1163/156852085X00091. JSTOR 3631862.
- Al-Bakhit, Mohammad (1995). "Sakhr". In Bosworth, C. E.; van Donzel, E.; Heinrichs, W. P. & Lecomte, G. (eds.). The Encyclopaedia of Islam, Second Edition. Volume VIII: Ned–Sam. Leiden: E. J. Brill. pp. 882–883. ISBN 978-90-04-09834-3.
- Bosworth, C. E. (1965). "Djudhām". In Lewis, B.; Pellat, Ch. & Schacht, J. (eds.). The Encyclopaedia of Islam, Second Edition. Volume II: C–G. Leiden: E. J. Brill. p. 573. OCLC 495469475.
- Caskel, Werner (1966). Ğamharat an-nasab: Das genealogische Werk des His̆ām ibn Muḥammad al-Kalbī, Volume II (in German). Leiden: Brill. OCLC 490272940.
- Crone, Patricia (1994). "Were the Qays and Yemen of the Umayyad Period Political Parties?". Der Islam. 71 (1). Walter de Gruyter and Co.: 1–57. doi:10.1515/islm.1994.71.1.1. ISSN 0021-1818. S2CID 154370527.
- Donner, Fred M. (1981). The Early Islamic Conquests. Princeton: Princeton University Press. ISBN 0-691-05327-8.
- Gil, Moshe (1997) [1983]. A History of Palestine, 634–1099. Translated by Ethel Broido. Cambridge: Cambridge University Press. ISBN 0-521-59984-9.
- Hasson, Isaac (1993). "Le chef judhāmite Rawḥ ibn Zinbāʿ". Studia Islamica (in French) (77): 95–122. doi:10.2307/1595791. JSTOR 1595791.
- Ibn 'Abd Rabbih (2011). Boullata, Emeritus Issa J. (ed.). The Unique Necklace, Volume III. Reading: Garnet Publishing Limited & Southern Court. ISBN 9781859642405.
- Prawer, Joshua (1985). "Social Classes in the Crusader States: The "Minorities"". In Setton, Kenneth M.; Zacour, Norman P.; Hazard, Harry W. (eds.). A History of the Crusades, Volume V: The Impact of the Crusades on the Near East. Vol. 5. Madison and London: University of Wisconsin Press. pp. 59–115. ISBN 0-299-09140-6.
