= Hadrami Rebellion (659) =

Battle of the First Fitna

- Part of First Fitna
Date	659
Location	Basra, Iraq
Result	Victory for Ali

Belligerents
Rashidun Caliphate	Uthmaniyya

Commanders and leaders
Ziyad ibn Abihi	Abd Allah ibn Amr †

Strength
50+	2,000

Casualties and losses
Unknown	Most of the army killed or captured

The Hadrami Rebellion (659) was a revolt carried out by the Uthmaniyya against Ali's authority in Basra, led by Abd Allah ibn Amr al-Hadrami. The uprising ended in failure after Ali's forces besieged the rebels.

== Background ==
Mu'awiya I had taken a number of measures to strengthen his position during the First Fitna. In contrast to the critics of Uthman, there were also people in Basra and Kufa who considered Ali's authority as illegitimate and defected to the Umayyads. Despite his unwillingness to recruit them, Mu'awiya enlisted the seceders by establishing garrison cities in Jund Qinnasrin to accommodate them. Al-Jazira and Mosul were the other regions where they settled.

== The Rebellion ==
After the Battle of the Camel, Basra came under Ali's control. Ali appointed his cousin, Abd Allah ibn Abbas, as the governor of Basra. Following his conquest of Egypt, Mu'awiya I dispatched Abd Allah ibn Amr al-Hadrami with 2000 men to Basra to launch a rebellion with the support of the Banu Tamim tribe there.

Ibn Abbas, the governor of Basra, had left for Kufa, leaving his deputy Ziyad ibn Abihi in charge. Ziyad informed Ali of the escalation and took refuge with the Banu Azd tribe. The Banu Tamim of Kufa was dispatched by Ali under A'yan ibn Dahi'ah al-Mujashi to confront the forces of Abd Allah ibn Amr but he was killed soon after his arrival in Basra.

Ali then sent Jariya ibn Qudama with 50 relief troops. Jariya then called for assistance from Ziyad with the Banu Azd tribe. They arrived in Basra, clashing with the forces of Abd Allah ibn Amr, forcing them to retreat and take refuge in the house of Sabil al-Saʿdi. The house was set on fire by Ali's forces, killing most of al-Hadrami's men including himself. Those who escaped were blocked by forts where they were besieged.

== See also ==
- Battle of Ayn al-Tamr (659)
