= Rawh ibn Zinba al-Judhami =

Umayyad governor of Palestine (died 703)

- Abū Zurʿa Rawḥ ibn Zinbāʾ al-Judhāmī

Governor of Palestine
- Monarch: Abd al-Malik ibn Marwan

Personal details
- Died: 703
- Occupation: Governor, Military Commander
- Known for: Umayyad governor of Palestine, adviser to Caliph Abd al-Malik, chieftain of the Judham tribe

Abū Zurʿa Rawḥ ibn Zinbāʿ al-Judhāmī (Arabic: روح بن زنباع الجذامي) (died 703) was the Umayyad governor of Palestine, one of the main advisers of Caliph Abd al-Malik and the chieftain of the Judham tribe.

== Life ==
=== Origins ===
Rawh was the son of Zinba ibn Rawh ibn Salama, a noble of the Judham, an Arab tribe that had been concentrated in Palestine before the Muslim conquest in the 630s. During this period, Zinba supervised a trading post for merchants crossing Palestine for the Byzantine Empire or its Ghassanid clients. Before the advent of Islam in the 620s–630s, a caravan of Qurayshi merchants from Mecca, including Umar ibn al-Khattab, attempted to cross through Zinba's post hiding gold in the stomach of one of their camels. Zinba suspected this, slaughtered the camel, confiscated part of the gold and insulted Umar, to which the latter threatened retaliation. According to this anecdote, traced back to Muhammad ibn al-Sa'ib al-Kalbi (d. 763), Zinba was operating under the authority of the Ghassanid phylarch al-Harith ibn Abi Shamir.

Rawh's brother Salama participated in a war council at the Beersheba estate of Amr ibn al-As. However, Rawh emerged as the most influential member of his family and became a rival of the Judham's preeminent chieftain, the elder Natil ibn Qays. The latter belonged to the Banu Sa'd clan of the tribe, while Rawh belonged to the Banu Wa'il clan, both of whose progenitors were sons of the Judhamite chief Malik ibn Zaydmanat ibn Afsa.

=== Service under the Umayyads ===
Rawh first appears in the historical record in 657 during the Battle of Siffin, where he was the commander of a contingent of Judham tribesmen from Jund Filastin (military district of Palestine) in the army of the governor of Syria, Mu'awiya I, against the forces of Caliph Ali (r. 656–661). He was also the flag bearer for the Judham as a whole, an honor typically reserved for the most distinguished nobleman of an Arab tribe. At an unknown point after Mu’awiya became caliph in 661, he may have appointed Rawh governor of Baalbek.

Though the Umayyad caliph Yazid I (r. 680–683) at one point questioned Rawh's loyalties, he dispatched him as part of a team charged with obtaining the oath of allegiance from the rebel Abd Allah ibn al-Zubayr of the Hejaz (western Arabia) in 681. They were unsuccessful and Rawh was again dispatched in 682–683 as a commander in Muslim ibn Uqba's army, which was sent to suppress the Hejaz rebellion. During that campaign, in which the Umayyad army defeated the rebels at the Battle of al-Harrah, Rawh was in charge of the Jund Filastin contingent.

Back in Palestine, Rawh campaigned to persuade the Judham to change their genealogical origin from Qahtan (southern Arabs) to Ma'add (northern Arabs) in order to bring the Judham closer to Rawh's allies the Banu Kalb of Quda'a, which at the time claimed descent from Ma'add. This effort was opposed by Natil. When Yazid and his successor, Mu'awiya II, died in quick succession in late 683 and early 684, Natil switched his allegiance from the Umayyads to the newly declared caliphate of Ibn al-Zubayr. The governors of the military districts of Hims, Qinnasrin and Damascus and the Arab tribes that filled their army ranks also gave their allegiance to Ibn al-Zubayr. The Kalb governor of Palestine, Ibn Bahdal, left to rally support for a new Umayyad caliph in the Jordan district, leaving Rawh as his replacement in Palestine. However, Natil soon after expelled Rawh, who maintained his loyalty to the Kalb and the Umayyads.

In the summit of pro-Umayyad tribes at Jabiyah hosted by Ibn Bahdal in 684, Rawh is credited with delivering a speech favoring Marwan ibn al-Hakam to assume the caliphate rather than other Umayyad candidates such as Khalid ibn Yazid, who was favored by Ibn Bahdal, and Amr ibn Sa'id al-Ashdaq. He was to be rewarded for his stance when Marwan was chosen by the delegates as caliph. At the Battle of Marj Rahit in 684, Rawh and his loyalists in the Judham fought alongside the pro-Umayyad tribal forces and decisively defeated the pro-Zubayrid Qays tribes. Umayyad control was subsequently reasserted throughout Syria, forcing Natil to flee Palestine, to which Rawh was assigned deputy governor.

Following Marwan's death in April 685, Rawh became a close adviser and aide to his son and successor, Caliph Abd al-Malik (r. 685–705). In the medieval sources, he is described as akin to the caliph's wazīr (vizier), a non-existent post at the time. Rawh died in 703. His descendants are mentioned in the historical record during the chaos marking the end of the Umayyad Caliphate in 750.

== Assessment ==
Abd al-Malik commended Rawh as a Syrian for his loyalty, an Iraqi for his shrewdness, a Hejazi for his knowledge in Islamic law and a Persian for his calligraphic skills. According to historian Moshe Gil, Rawh was known to be a "very gifted" adviser of Abd al-Malik. Gil and Hawting describe his role in the caliph's administration as a precedent of the post of wazīr. Rawh is counted by some medieval sources as a sahaba (companion of the Islamic prophet Muhammad) and was known as a transmitter of hadith.

== Bibliography ==
- Crone, Patricia (1980). Slaves on Horses: The Evolution of the Islamic Polity (1980 ed.). Cambridge: Cambridge University Press. ISBN 978-0521229616.
- Gil, Moshe (1997) [1983]. A History of Palestine, 634–1099. Translated by Ethel Broido. Cambridge: Cambridge University Press. ISBN 0-521-59984-9.
- Hasson, Isaac (1993). "Le chef judhāmite Rawḥ ibn Zinbāʿ". Studia Islamica (in French) (77): 95–122. doi:10.2307/1595791. JSTOR 1595791.
- Hawting, G. R. (1995). "Rawḥ ibn Zinbāʿ al-Judhāmī". In Bosworth, C. E.; van Donzel, E.; Heinrichs, W. P. & Lecomte, G. (eds.). The Encyclopaedia of Islam, Second Edition. Volume VIII: Ned–Sam. Leiden: E. J. Brill. p. 466. ISBN 978-90-04-09834-3.
