= Al-Aqiser =

Archaeological site in Ayn al-Tamr, Iraq

- الأقيصر (Arabic)
- Location within Iraq
- 32°29′51″N 43°34′31″E
- Type: Church
- Location: Iraq
- Region: Karbala Governorate

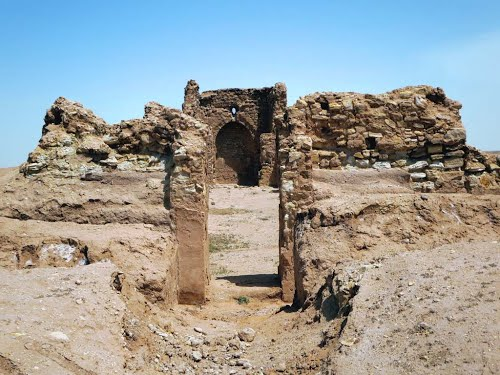
Al-Aqiser Church

Al-Aqiser (Arabic: الأقيصر, lit. 'Mini Palace') is an archeological site in Ayn al-Tamr near Karbala in Iraq with what has been described as the Oldest eastern Christian Church. Until recently it was used by Assyrians of the Chaldean Catholic Church. The site is currently suffering neglect and erosion.
