= Natil ibn Qays =

Chieftain and Palestinian tribal leader (died 685/686)

Natil ibn Qays ibn Zayd al-Judhami (Arabic: ناتل بن قيس الجذامي) (died 685/86) was the chieftain of the Banu Judham tribe and a prominent tribal leader in Palestine during the reigns of caliphs Mu'awiya I and Yazid I. In 684, he revolted against the Umayyads, took control of Palestine and gave his allegiance to Caliph Abd Allah ibn al-Zubayr. He joined the latter in Mecca after pro-Zubayrid forces were routed at the Battle of Marj Rahit. He may have renewed his rebellion in Palestine in 685/86 and was slain during the hostilities.

== Life ==
Natil ibn Qays was a chieftain of the Banu Judham, an Arab tribe resident in Palestine, specifically its dominant clan, the Banu Sa'd. His father, Qays ibn Zayd, was a member of a delegation of Judham tribesmen to the Islamic prophet Muhammad; upon their meeting, the delegates converted to Islam and Qays was declared the chief of the Banu Sa'd. Natil is listed by the 9th-century historian al-Baladhuri as being among the Arab chiefs who assembled in Jerusalem with their respective tribesmen to give the oath of allegiance to Mu'awiya I as caliph in 660. Specifically, he is described as the leader of the Judham and Lakhm tribes of Jund Filastin (military district of Palestine). Throughout the reigns of Mu'awiya I and Yazid I, between 661 and 683, he was "evidently omnipotent in Palestine and dominated its financial administration".

After the deaths of Yazid and his son and successor Mu'awiya II in 684, the Qays tribes of northern Syria led by Zufar ibn al-Harith al-Kilabi and Homs under Nu'man ibn Bashir al-Ansari declared allegiance for the Mecca-based, anti-Umayyad caliph Abd Allah ibn al-Zubayr. In Palestine, the staunchly pro-Umayyad governor and a chieftain of the Banu Kalb, Ibn Bahdal, left to rally loyalist tribes in the Jordan district against Ibn al-Zubayr, and left Rawh ibn Zinba as his acting governor. The latter was Natil's rival for leadership of the Judham. Not long after, Natil launched a revolt, expelled Rawh and declared himself governor in allegiance with Ibn al-Zubayr.

Natil contributed troops from Palestine to support the pro-Zubayrid governor of Damascus, al-Dahhak ibn Qays al-Fihri, and the Qaysi tribes at the Battle of Marj Rahit against the Umayyad caliph Marwan I and his tribal allies, dominated by the Kalb. The pro-Zubayrid forces were routed and Natil consequently fled Palestine to seek safe haven with Ibn al-Zubayr in Mecca. According to the 9th-century historians, al-Ya'qubi and al-Mas'udi, Natil staged a revolt in Palestine against Marwan's son and successor, Abd al-Malik, though the historian Julius Wellhausen writes that this event may be erroneous. According to this account, Natil was slain in the revolt in 685/86 fighting Umayyad loyalist tribes.

== Bibliography ==
- Gil, Moshe (1997) [1983]. A History of Palestine, 634–1099. Translated by Ethel Broido. Cambridge: Cambridge University Press. ISBN 0-521-59984-9.
- Hasson, Isaac (1993). "Le chef judhāmite Rawḥ ibn Zinbāʿ". Studia Islamica (in French) (77): 95–122. JSTOR 1595791.
- Hawting, G. R., ed. (1989). The History of al-Ṭabarī, Volume XX: The Collapse of Sufyānid Authority and the Coming of the Marwānids: The Caliphates of Muʿāwiyah II and Marwān I and the Beginning of the Caliphate of ʿAbd al-Malik, A.D. 683–685/A.H. 64–66. SUNY Series in Near Eastern Studies. Albany, New York: State University of New York Press. ISBN 978-0-88706-855-3.
- Wellhausen, Julius (1927). The Arab Kingdom and Its Fall. Translated by Margaret Graham Weir. Calcutta: University of Calcutta.
