= Expedition of Ali ibn Abi Talib (Al-Fuls) =

Location	Banu Tayy
Result	Victory for Ali

Belligerents
Muslims	Banu Tayy

Commanders and leaders
Ali ibn Abi Talib	Adi ibn Hatim (WIA)

Strength
150	Unknown

Casualties and losses
0	Unknown

The Expedition of Ali ibn Abi Talib, against the Banu Tai tribe, took place in August 630 AD, 9AH, second month, of the Islamic Calendar. to destroy the statue (idol) of the pagan deity al-Fuls (al-Qullus).

== Banu Tai ==
The Banu Tai were a tribe divided between the profession of idolatry and Christianity.

The chief of the tribe was Hatim Tai, he came to prominence because of his generosity and he acquired fame as a great hero of Arabia at the time, according to the Encyclopedia of Islam. Hatim was succeeded by Adi, who tried to follow in the footsteps of his father. Adi was very religious.

== Expedition ==
Muhammad sent Ali ibn Abi Talib with 150 men to destroy the statue (idol) of the pagan deity al-Fuls (al-Qullus), worshipped by the people of Banu Tai. 100 of the Muslim fighters were on camel and the rest were on horseback. Ali took with him a black flag, and a white banner. Adi bin Hatim (the chief of the tribe) escaped to Syria.

At dawn, Ali carried out a raid on the inhabitants and demolished the statue of al-Fuls (al-Qullus), and captured many camels and sheep as war booty. The Muslims also took a number of men, women and children as captives. One of the captives was Hatim Tai's (the former chief of the tribes) daughter. Adi bin Hatim (the chief of the tribe) escaped to Syria.

Inside the al-Qullus safe the Muslims found three swords and three pieces of armour. They then shared the spoils and left the best for Muhammad.

== Aftermath ==
Upon arrival in Madinah, the sister of 'Adi bin Hatim begged Muhammad for mercy on her and said:

O Messenger of Allâh, my brother is absent and father is dead, and I am too old to render any service. Be beneficent to me so that Allâh may be bountiful to you.He said: "Who is your brother?" She said: "It is 'Adi bin Hatim.", and Muhammad replied: "Is he not the one who fled from Allâh and his Messenger?

Muhammad then went away from her. The next day she reiterated the same thing and received the same answer. A day later she said the same thing a third time, but this time she was given a horse to go looking for her brother.

Her brother came to Muhammad and a conversation took place. The Muslim scholar Ibn Qayyim Al-Jawziyya mentions the conversation and event in his book Zad al-Ma'ad as follows:

What makes you flee? Do you flee lest you should say there is no god but Allâh? Do you know any other god but Allâh?" "No" he said, then talked for a while. The Messenger of Allâh went on saying: "Certainly you flee so that you may not hear the statement saying 'Allâh is the Greatest.' Do you know anyone who is greater than Allâh?" "No" he said. "The Jews are those whose portion is wrath, and the Christians are those who have gone astray," the Prophet retorted. "I am a Muslim and I believe in one God (Allâh)." 'Adi finally proclaimed with a joyous face. The Prophet ordered him a residence with one of the Helpers. From that time he started calling at the Prophet in the mornings and in the evenings.

Adi then embraced Islam as was reappointed the chief of his tribe. The entire tribe then converted to Islam.

== Islamic primary sources ==
The event is also mentioned by the Muslim Scholar Ibn Sa'd in his book "Kitab al-tabaqat al-kabir", as follows:

THE SARIYYAH OF 'ALl IBN ABl TALIB TO DEMOLISH AL-FULS, THE IDOL OF TAYY

Then (occurred) the sariyyah of 'Ali lbn Abi Talib, may Allah be pleased with him, towards al-Fuls, the idol of the Tayy, to demolish it, in the month of Rabi' al-Awwal the ninth year, from the hijrah of the Apostle of Allah, may Allah bless him.

They (narrators) said: The Apostle of Allah, may Allah bless him, sent 'Ali ibn Abi Talib with one hundred camels and fifty horses, with a black banner and a white flag with him to demolish al-Fuls.

They launched a surprise attack early in the Morning on the quarter of the family of Hatim. They demolished al-Fuls and destroyed it. They filled, their hands with (took many) captives, camels and goats. Among the captives was the sister of 'Adi Ibn Hatim who had fled to Syria. In the treasure of al- Fuls, were found three swords – Rasub, al-Mikhdham and a sword known as al-Yamani – as well as three coats of mail. The Apostle of Allah, may Allah bless him, appointed Aba Qatadadh, the custodian of the captives. He appointed 'Abd Allah lbn Atik custodian of cattle and property.

[Kitab al-tabaqat al-kabir, by Ibn Sa'd, Volume 2, p. 202]

Ibn Sa'd also explains the aftermath of this event, and Adi ibn Hatim's conversion to Islam, he wrote:

'Adi Ibn Hatim escaped from the cavalry of the Prophet, may Allah bless him, and he reached Syria. He was a Christian and used to go with his people to al-Mirba'. Hatim's daughter was lodged in an enclosure near the door of mosque. She was beautiful and sweet-tongued. The Apostle of Allaah, may Allah bless him, passed (by her); she stood and said : The father has expired and the deputationist (brother) has disappeared, oblige me and Allah will be benevolent to you. He said: Who is your deputationist ? She said : 'Adi Ibn Hatim. He said : He is running away from Allah and from His Apostle. In the meantime a deputation of the Quda'ah arrived from Syria.

She continued : The Prophet clothed me, gave me money and provided a beast, for me. I set out with them and approached 'Adi in Syria. I said to him : You have severed a uterine relationship, set out with your wife and children leaving the remaining children of your father behind. She lived there for several days and said to him : I feel you should join the Apostle of Allah. Thereupon 'Adi set out and came to the Apostle of Allah (may Allah bless him), and greeted him. He was in the mosque, and he said : Who is the man ? He said : 'Adi Ibn Hatim. He took him to his home, and placed a cushion stuffed with palm fibres, and said to him : Sit on it. The Apostle of Allah, may Allah bless him, sat on the earth and offered Islam to him. Adi embraced Islam and the Apostle of Allah appointed him the collector of sadaqat of his people.

[Kitab al-tabaqat al-kabir, by Ibn Sa'd, Volume 2, p. 380]

The Muslim scholar, Saifur Rahman al Mubarakpuri, referenced a Hadith from Musnad Ahmad ibn Hanbal (a Hadith collection) in his biography of Muhammad the "Sealed Nectar". The contents of the Hadith were as follows:

The Prophet said: "'Adi, embrace Islam and you shall be secure." "But I am a man of religion." Said 'Adi. "I know your religion better than you." Said the Prophet. "Do you know my religion better than me?" 'Adi asked. The Prophet replied, "Yes". He said: "Are you not cast in disbelief because you appropriate to yourself the fourth of your people’s gains?" "Yes". Said 'Adi. "It is unlawful in your religion to do such a thing." The Prophet said, and ‘'Adi added: "He did not need to say it again for I immediately acquiesced it." [Musnad Imam Ahmad]

== See also ==
- Military career of Muhammad
- List of expeditions of Muhammad
- Military career of Ali
- Adnanites
