= Jabiyah =

Town of political and military significance in the 6th–8th centuries

- الجابية (Arabic)
- Tell Jabiyah
- Location within Syria
- 32°55′8″N 35°59′48″E
- Type: Tell
- Location: Syria
- Region: Daraa Governorate

Jabiyah (Arabic: الجابية / ALA-LC: al-Jābiya) was a town of political and military significance in the 6th–8th centuries. It was located between the Hawran plain and the Golan Heights. It initially served as the capital of the Ghassanids, an Arab vassal kingdom of the Byzantine Empire.

Following the Muslim conquest of Syria, it early on became the Muslims' main military camp in the region and, for a time, the capital of Jund Dimashq (military district of Damascus). Caliph Umar convened a meeting of senior Muslim figures at the city where the organization of Syria and military pay were decided.

Later, in 684, Jabiyah was the site of a summit of Arab tribes that chose Marwan I to succeed Caliph Mu'awiya II. Jabiyah was often used by the Umayyad caliphs as a retreat. Its significance declined when Caliph Sulayman made Dabiq the Muslims' main military camp in Syria. It was located west of the city of Nawa, Daraa.

== Etymology ==
Jabiyah has a "curious etymology", according to historian Irfan Shahid. The name may be related to the Arabic word for "reservoir" or a Syriac word for "the Chosen".

== History ==
=== Ghassanid period ===
Jabiyah was first mentioned in circa 520 CE in a Syriac letter of Bishop Simeon of Beth Arsham in which he states that he wrote his letter from the camp of the Ghassanid king Jabalah IV ibn al-Harith at Jabiyah, which he refers to as "Gbīthā". The Ghassanids were an Arab Christian vassal kingdom of the Byzantine Empire. The letter noted that there was a Ghassanid military camp nearby. According to Shahid, Simeon's letter reveals that Jabiyah was the place where foreign envoys and other dignitaries convened with the Ghassanid kings, indicating the town's importance. The town was again referenced in 569 in a Syriac letter noting the "monastery of St. Sergius" in Jabiyah. In 587, Jabiyah served as a meeting place for two Monophysite groups, one led by the Syriac Patriarch Peter and the other by the Coptic Pope Damian of Alexandria, that wanted to settle their religious disputes. The groups failed to reach an agreement, but the meeting of rival Monophysite factions in Jabiyah indicates its importance as a Monophysite center.

Jabiyah functioned as the capital of the Ghassanids. It was used by the Ghassanid kings for their residences. Jabiya was referred to as "Jābiyat al-Jawlān" (the Jabiyah of Gaulanitis) by the Ghassanid court poet Hassan. The city was apparently unscathed in the Lakhmid-led raids against Byzantine Syria and in the Persian invasion of Syria.

=== Rashidun period ===
During the Muslim conquest of Syria, Muslim forces captured booty from the defeated Byzantine army in the aftermath of the nearby Battle of Yarmouk. Afterward, Jabiyah became the main military camp of the Muslims in Syria. The site was chosen by Caliph Umar in 638 to hold a meeting of the principal ṣaḥāba (companions of Muhammad) to determine the affairs of Syria. This included the distribution of war spoils, organization of the military administration of Syria and determination of the soldiers' wages. That same year, Umar made a speech, frequently mentioned in Muslim tradition, called khuṭbat al-Jābiya; before a large gathering of generals and ṣaḥāba, Umar decreed the establishment of the dīwān (administrative endowments). Initially, it was decided that the local Arab tribes of Syria would be excluded from the dīwān, but they were ultimately incorporated under pressure of their opposition.

According to ancient sources, Jews met with Umar in Jabiyah and, citing the harsh climate and plagues, requested permission to drink wine, but after suggesting honey, which they found ineffective, Umar allowed them to prepare a non-intoxicating dish from boiled grape syrup, which he remarked resembled camel ointment.

Jabiyah served as the initial administrative center of Jund Dimashq (military district of Damascus). During the plague of Imwas, which killed numerous Muslim troops, Jabiyah was used as a refuge for ill soldiers to recuperate due to its favorable climatic conditions. As a result, it became the site where soldiers' pay was distributed. A large mosque with minbar (pulpit) was built in the town, which was a privilege putting Jabiyah on par with provincial capitals of the Caliphate. Between 639/40 and 660, Jabiyah served as the capital of Islamic Syria in its entirety under the governorship of Mu'awiya I.

=== Umayyad period ===
After the establishment of the Umayyad Caliphate by Mu'awiya I in 661, Jabiyah would become a city that all Umayyad caliphs would pass through during their reigns. With the death of Mu'awiya II in 684 and Abd Allah ibn al-Zubayr's growing control over the Caliphate, the local Arab tribes of Syria convened at Jabiyah to maintain Umayyad rule. The summit was presided over by Ibn Bahdal, the chieftain of the Banu Kalb and cousin of Caliph Yazid I (r. 680–683). The summit was not attended by the Qaysi tribes or the governor of Jund Dimashq, al-Dahhak ibn Qays al-Fihri, all of whom supported or sympathized with Ibn al-Zubayr. Though Ibn Bahdal lobbied for Mu'awiya II's half-brothers to accede, the other Arab chieftains dismissed this suggestion due to the half-brothers' youth and inexperience. A chieftain of the Banu Judham, Rawh ibn Zinba', backed Marwan I for the caliphal throne, and the other chieftains followed suit. An agreement was finally reached whereby Marwan would become caliph, followed by Khalid ibn Yazid, then Amr ibn Sa'id al-Ashdaq. "In this way the unity of the Umayyad party was restored, and al-Jabiya became the cradle of the Marwanid dynasty", according to historian Henri Lammens.

Marwan later changed the succession order agreed to at Jabiyah by designating his own son Abd al-Malik as his heir. During the latter's reign (685–705), Jabiyah was often used by the caliph as a month-long resort in the spring on his return to Damascus from his winter resort at al-Sinnabra on Lake Tiberias. It was at Jabiyah that Abd al-Malik decreed that his sons al-Walid I and Sulayman should succeed him as caliph. Lammens and Shahid both described this as "the last great political event" that occurred in Jabiyah. During Caliph Sulayman's reign (715–717), Jabiyah's role declined as the main Syrian military camp was shifted north to Dabiq near the Arab–Byzantine frontier. Nonetheless, Jabiyah remained the center of a district within Jund Dimashq. Its significance waned further with the rise of the Iraq-based Abbasid Caliphate in 750.

=== Modern era ===
Jabiyah's decline beginning in the early 8th century has rendered it, in Shahid's words, as "entirely vanished" in the present day. Jabiyah's former existence is attested to in the nearby hill which carries its name, Tell al-Jabiyah, and the Bab al-Jabiyah gate of old Damascus. Tell al-Jabiyah was described by a 19th-century Western archaeologist as "the most conspicuous point of all the country around. It is a hill with two peaks, the eastern and the highest of which reaches an elevation of 2,322 feet above the sea. It commands a fine view over Northern Hawran and Jedur".

== Bibliography ==
- Kennedy, Hugh N. (2004). The Prophet and the Age of the Caliphates: The Islamic Near East from the 6th to the 11th Century (Second ed.). Harlow: Pearson Education Limited. ISBN 0-582-40525-4.
- Lammens, H. (1991) [1965]. "Al-D̲j̲ābiya". In Lewis, B.; Pellat, Ch.; Schacht, J. (eds.). The Encyclopedia of Islam. Vol. II: C–G (new ed.). Leiden and New York: Brill. p. 360. ISBN 90-04-07026-5.
- Shahid, Irfan (2002). Byzantium and the Arabs in the Sixth Century, Volume II, Part 1: Toponmyny, Monuments, Historical Geography and Frontier Studies. Washington D.C.: Dumbarton Oaks Research Library and Collection. ISBN 0-88402-284-6.
