= Battle of Kafr Tutha (658) =

Battle of the First Fitna

- Part of First Fitna
- The region of Al-Jazira
Date	658
Location	Kafr Tutha, Circesium, Al-Jazira
Result	Victory for Ali

Belligerents
Rashidun Caliphate	Umayyad Syria

Commanders and leaders
Ali ibn Abi Talib; Kumayl ibn Ziyad; Shabib ibn Amir al-Azdi	Mu'awiya ibn Abi Sufyan; Abd al-Rahman ibn Qubath; Ma'n ibn Yazid al-Sulami

Strength
400	2,400

Casualties and losses
Two killed	Heavy

The Battle of Kafr Tutha was a military confrontation in the Jazira between the forces of the fourth Rashidun caliph, Ali ibn Abi Talib, under Kumayl ibn Ziyad, and the forces of the Umayyad governor of Syria, Mu'awiya ibn Abi Sufyan, under Abd al-Rahman ibn Qubath. The conflict was part of the First Fitna and resulted in the victory of Ali's forces.

== Background ==
Mu'awiya I had taken a number of measures to strengthen his position during the First Fitna. In contrast to the critics of Uthman, there were also people in Basra and Kufa who considered Ali's authority as illegitimate and defected to the Umayyads, however despite his unwillingness to recruit them, Mu'awiya enlisted the seceders while keeping them separate from the Syrian army by establishing garrison cities in Jund Qinnarsin, originally a part of Jund Hims, to accommodate them. Al-Jazira and Mosul were the other regions where they settled.

== Conflict ==
Kumayl ibn Ziyad was stationed at Hit when Sufyan ibn Awf led a raid on Anbar. Kumayl proceeded to Circesium after stationing a deputy in charge of Hit to confront a group of raiders who had agreed to assault the city. When Sufyan's army approached Hit, many of the troops stationed at Hit began fleeing, leaving only fifty troops to defend Hit. Kumayl's decision to abandon Hit and proceed to Circesium was condemned by Ali. Shabib ibn Amir, the governor of Nusaybin, informed Kumayl that Mu'awiya had dispatched Abd al-Rahman ibn Qubath against Circesium.

Kumayl advanced to intercept Abd al-Rahman's forces, in case they launched an attack on Nusaybin, and confronted them with 400 horsemen. He then received news of the Syrian troops being stationed at Kafr Tutha. Kumayl marched towards Kafr Tutha where Abd al-Rahman ibn Qubath and Ma'an ibn Yazid confronted him with 2400 men. Kumayl charged at them, scattering most of their forces and inflicting casualties. He instructed his troops to not pursue anyone fleeing or to kill a wounded man. Two men from Kumayl's army were killed. Shabib ibn Amir arrived with 600 troops to aid Kumayl, however prior to their arrival, Kumayl had already routed the Umayyad forces. Kumayl informed Ali about his victory, who congratulated and rewarded him.
