= Battle of Ayn al-Tamr (659) =

Battle of the First Fitna

- Part of First Fitna
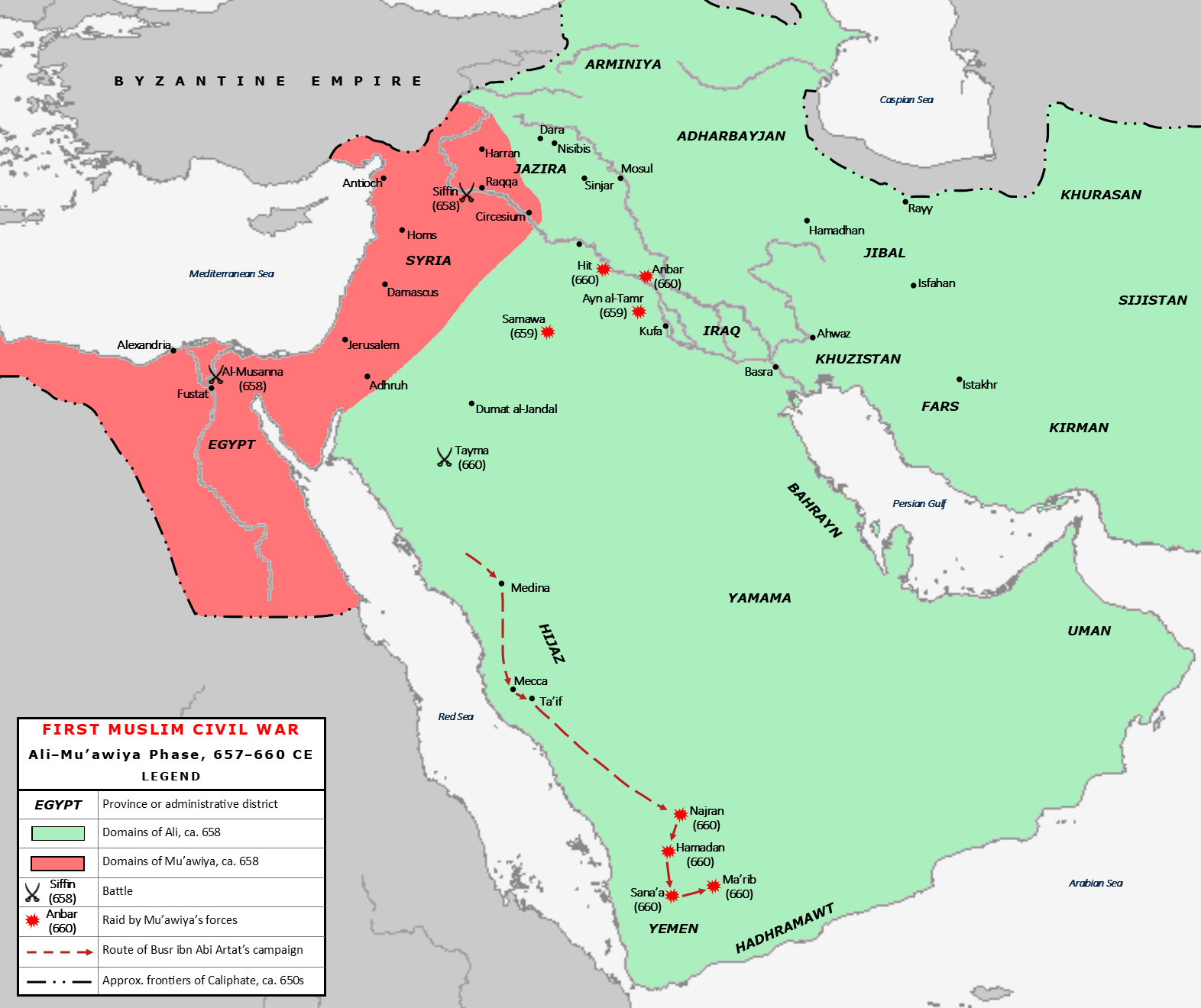
Date	659
Location	Ayn al-Tamr, Iraq
Result	Victory for Ali

Belligerents
Umayyad Syria	Rashidun Caliphate

Commanders and leaders
Mu'awiya ibn Abi Sufyan; Nu'man ibn Bashir	Ali ibn Abi Talib; Adi ibn Hatim

Strength
2,000 troops	100 troops

Casualties and losses
258 killed	3 killed

The Battle of Ayn al Tamr (659) was a military confrontation that took place at Ayn al-Tamr between the forces of the fourth Rashidun caliph, Ali ibn Abi Talib, and the forces of the Umayyad governor of Syria, Mu'awiya ibn Abi Sufyan. The conflict was part of the First Fitna and resulted in the victory of Ali's forces.

== Background ==
Nu'man ibn Bashir had been sent earlier by Mu'awiya I to question Ali about handing over the killers of Uthman. Nu'man stayed a month with Ali before fleeing and being captured in Ayn al-Tamr by the governor Malik ibn Ka'b. When Nu'man urged him not to inform Ali, Malik gave him two days to escape and threatened to behead him. Two months after Al-Dahhak's raid on Iraq, Nu'man enlisted for Mu'awiya to retaliate against Malik.

== The Confrontation ==
Mu'awiya I sent Nu'man ibn Bashir with a contingent of 2000 troops to Ayn al-Tamr, which was a defense base of Ali under Malik ibn Ka'b. Malik informed Ali about Nu'man's advance, and he began preparations for sending reinforcements. Adi ibn Hatim offered his support alongside 1000 men from the Banu Tayy.

The Banu Tayy awaited for an order from Malik ibn Ka'b to advance, however Malik had already sent Abd Allah ibn Hawalah and reinforcements from Mikhnaf ibn Sulaym. Mikhnaf mobilised 50 troops which were under the command of Abd al-Rahman ibn Mikhnaf and they arrived in the evening. Until then, Nu'man's 2,000 troops had failed to subdue Malik's forces and upon the arrival of reinforcements they began to flee.
