= Battle of Ayn al-Tamr =

633 battle

Coordinates: 32°33′58.0″N 43°29′25.4″E

- Part of Muslim conquest of Persia and Campaigns of Khalid ibn al-Walid
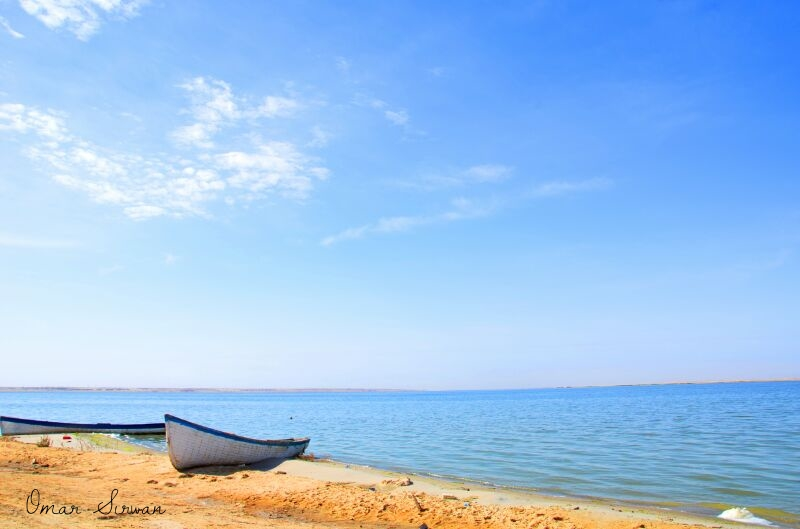
- Al-Razzaza Lake in Ain Al-Tamr
Date	633 AD
Location	Ayn al-Tamr, Sasanian Empire
Result	Rashidun victory
Territorial changes	Ayn al-Tamr town annexed by Rashidun Caliphate

Belligerents
Rashidun Caliphate	Sasanian Empire; Arab Christians

Commanders and leaders
Khalid ibn al-Walid	Mihran Bahram-i Chubin (MIA); Aqqa ibn Qays ibn Bashir (executed)

Strength
500–800 (Note: Phillip Khuri Hitti mentioned from Baladhuri records from two sources, the first give estimation number between 500 and 600 men, while the second source gave stable report of 800 men)	1,000-2,000(modern estimates) 20,000-30,000

Casualties and losses
20-30	Entire field army executed Persian garrison defenders of the town slaughtered

The Battle of Ayn al-Tamr (Arabic: معركة عين التمر) took place in modern-day Iraq (Mesopotamia) between the early Muslim Arab forces and the Sassanians along with their Arab Christian auxiliary forces. Ayn al-Tamr is located west of Anbar and was a frontier post which had been established to aid the Sassanids.

The Muslims under Khalid ibn al-Walid's command soundly defeated the Sassanian auxiliary force, which included large numbers of non-Muslim Arabs who broke earlier covenants with the Muslims. According to William Muir, Khalid ibn al-Walid captured the Arab Christian commander, Aqqa ibn Qays ibn Bashir, with his own hands, which matched the accounts of both Ibn Atheer in his Usd al-ghabah fi marifat al-Saḥabah, and Tabari in his Tarikh.

== Battle preparation ==
Before the battle, Khalid ibn al-Walid deployed his cavalry on both flanks of the army, while he personally commanded the center, surrounded by a select group of elite guard troops. According to the plan attributed to Khalid, the Muslim flanks were to initiate limited skirmishes without committing to a major assault. Their role was to distract and engage the flanks of the Arab Christian army, while the Muslim center remained passive until Khalid gave the signal for the decisive attack. (Note: The strategy which Khalid planned before the battle has been explained in such details by Blankinship quotation of Tabari)

The coalition army formed its battle line in front of the fortress of Ayn al-Tamr. ʿAqqaʾ, commanding the Arab Christian forces, was positioned opposite Khalid and the Muslim center. Meanwhile, Mihran Bahram-i Chubin and his Persian troops remained inside the fortress, awaiting developments on the battlefield. (Note: Khalid Yahya Blankinship notes Tabari named the persian commander Mihran bin Bahram Chobin, which Blankinship translate it roughly as Mihran son of Chobin).

== Battle ==
The battle began exactly as Khalid had planned. The Muslim cavalry units positioned on both flanks immediately advanced and engaged the Sasanian coalition's wings, while Khalid remained behind with the army's central force. Observing the apparent inactivity of the Muslim center, ʿAqqa became focused on the fighting along the flanks and paid little attention to Khalid's position.

As the Arab Christian forces became fully engaged against the Muslim flanks, Khalid launched the decisive phase of his plan. Accompanied only by a small group of guards, he suddenly charged from the center directly toward ʿAqqa's position. The unexpected maneuver caught the Arab Christian army by surprise, leaving little time to react.

Khalid and his men quickly reached ʿAqqa and confronted him. According to Ibn al-Athir, Khalid captured ʿAqqa and "carried him in his hands like a small child" before returning with his captive to the Muslim camp under the protection of his guards. (Note: William Muir and Khalid Yahya Blankinship both mentioned the capture of Aqqa' which personally done by Khalid ibn Walid which similar to Tabari narration. Muir mentioned Khalid caught Aqqa' by his own hands, while Blankinship notes the duel before Aqqa' capture, which he translate it straight from book of Tabari. The capture of Aqqa by Khalid also cited by Ibn Kathir in his book, Al-Bidaya wa'l-Nihaya)

The capture of their commander had an immediate psychological impact on the Arab Christian forces. Shocked to see ʿAqqa taken alive and publicly displayed before them, the army lost its will to continue fighting. The soldiers ceased resistance and surrendered to the Muslim forces. (Note: The battle sequences mostly derived from Blankinship version of History of Tabari)

== Aftermath ==
The Muslim armies marched to the town garrison while parading their prisoners and lining them up in the front of defenders of the garrison and threaten to execute them if they did not surrender and open the gates. The garrison defenders instead rejected the threat and fight behind the wall, which caused Khalid to immediately commanded all prisoners to be executed immediately, including Aqqa'

Then Khalid instructed the entire forces to storm the city of Ayn al-Tamr and slaughter the Persian inside the garrison after they breached.

After the city had been subdued, some Persians had hoped that the Muslim commander, Khalid ibn al-Walid, would be "like those Arabs who would raid [and withdraw]." However, Khalid continued to press further against the Persians and their allies in the subsequent Battle of Dawmat al-Jandal, while he left two of his deputies, Al-Qa'qa' ibn Amr al-Tamimi and Abu Layla, to lead separate forces in order to intercept another Persian-Arab Christians enemy coming from the east, which led to the Battle of Husayd

When the Muslim army conquered the town of Ayn al-Tamr they found 40 Arab Christian choirboys within a monastery. All of those 40 children were brought by the Muslim troops to Medina.

Most of these choirboys are known as the ancestors of important figures of Islam in the later era, including:

- Nusair, the father of Musa bin Nusayr, the supreme commander of the forces which later conquered Spain under the leadership of Tariq bin Ziyad, the second in command for Musa bin Nusayr.
- Sirin, the other convert, was the father of the scholar Ibn Sirin who became one of the more celebrated Muslim theologians.
- Yassar, the grandfather of famous Abbasid historian Ibn Ishaq.
- Abu Amrah, the grandfather Abdallah ibn Abu Amrah, a famous poet of later era.

== See also ==
- Abu Bakr
- Umar ibn al-Khattāb

== Bibliography ==
- A.I. Akram, The Sword of Allah: Khalid bin al-Waleed, His Life and Campaigns, Nat. Publishing. House, Rawalpindi (1970) ISBN 0-7101-0104-X.
- Baladhuri, Ahmad Bin Yahya Bin Jabir (2011). The Origins of the Islamic State Being a Translation from the Arabic Accompanied With Annotations, Geographic and Historic Notes of the Kitab Futuh Al-buldan (Phillip Kuri Hitti ed.). Cosimo, Incorporated. p. 169. ISBN 9781616405342.
- Ibn Atheer, Ali. "Usd al-ghabah fi marifat al-Saḥabah". Wikisource. Wikipedia.
- Ibn Kathir, Abu al-Fiḍā ‘Imād Ad-Din Ismā‘īl ibn ‘Umar (2002). Al-bidayah wan nihayah masa Khulafa'ur Rasyidin(The Beginning to the End: era of Rashidun caliphate) (Abu Ihsan al-Atsari Indonesian ed.). Darul Haq.
- Muir, William (1883). Annals of the Early Caliphate From Original Sources. Smith, Elder & Company. p. 85.
- Sallam, Abu Ubayd (2003). The Book of Revenue. Garnet Publishing, Limited. p. 194. ISBN 9781859641590.
- Tabari, Muhammad Ibn Jarir (1993). The challenge to the empires (Khalid Yahya Blankinship ed.). State University of New York Press. pp. 53–54. ISBN 9780791408513.
