= Battle of Tayma (659) =

Battle of the First Fitna (659 AD)

- Part of First Fitna
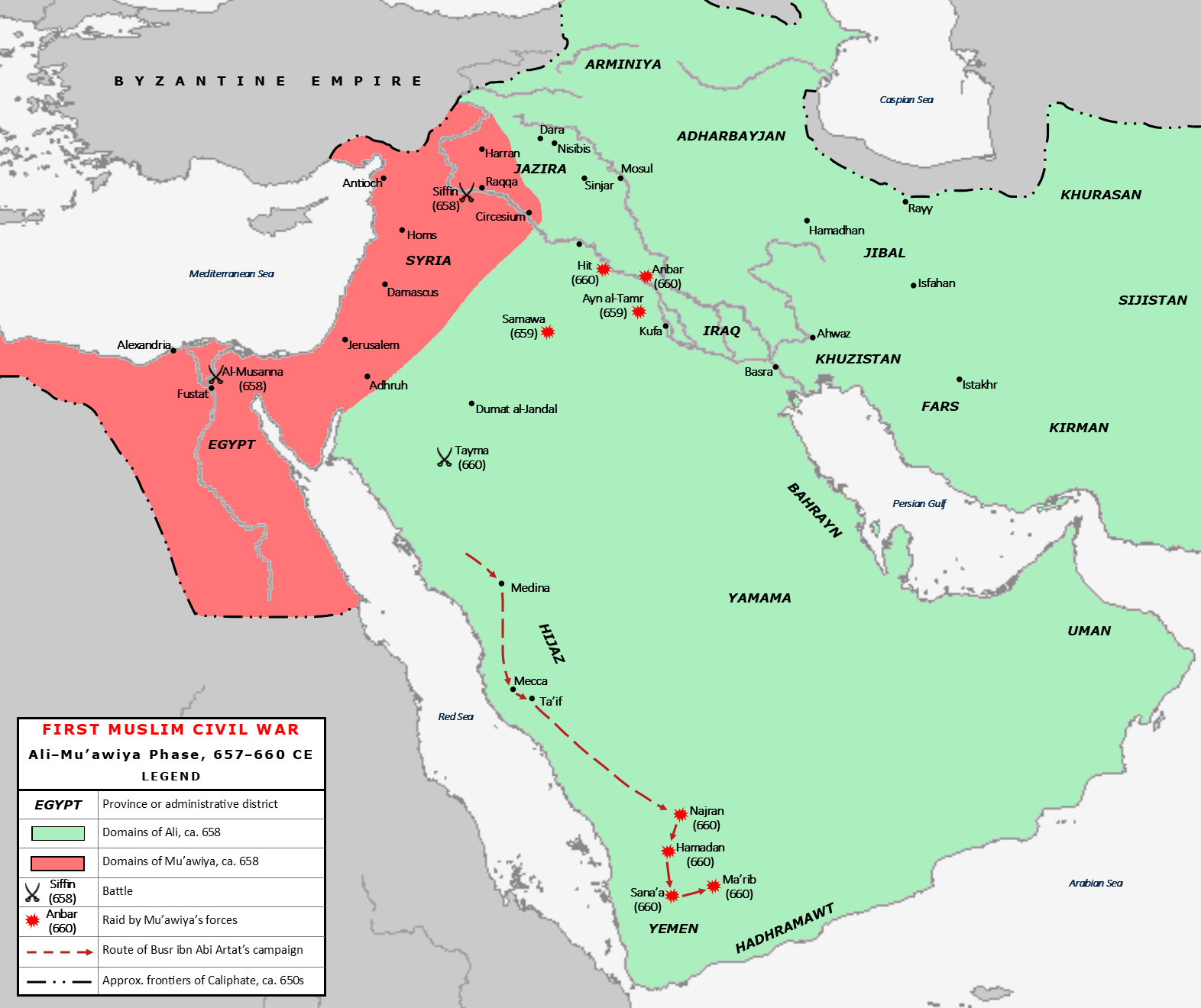
- Map of the First Fitna
Date	659
Location	Tayma
Result	Victory for Ali

Belligerents
Rashidun Caliphate	Umayyad Syria

Commanders and leaders
Ali ibn Abi Talib; Al-Musayyib ibn Najabah	Mu'awiya ibn Abi Sufyan; Abd Allah ibn Mas'ada

Strength
1,700 troops	7,000 troops
- The number of casualties on both sides is unknown but the Umayyad forces suffered heavily in terms of those who fled and those affected by the fire.

The Battle of Tayma was a military confrontation that took place during the First Fitna after Mu'awiya I dispatched a military expedition against the fort of Tayma which was under the control of the fourth Rashidun caliph, Ali. The expedition was a failure for the Umayyad forces who were forced to retreat, resulting in Ali's forces securing control over the fort of Tayma.

== Background ==
After the assassination of the third caliph, Uthman ibn Affan, conflict arose between his successor, the fourth caliph Ali ibn Abi Talib, and Uthman's Umayyad kinsman Mu'awiya ibn Abi Sufyan, the long-time governor of Syria, who demanded retribution for all those who took part in Uthman’s death. This led to the outbreak of the First Fitna, during which Ali's Iraqi army fought Mu'awiya's Syrian forces to a stalemate at the Battle of Siffin, which was followed by an inconclusive arbitration.

Mu'awiya then launched a campaign against Egypt, during which Ali's governors were killed, and Egypt was annexed by the Umayyads. Subsequently, Mu'awiya also launched raids against the Hejaz, sending Abd Allah ibn Mas'ada with 7,000 men to compel its inhabitants to accept Mu'awiya's authority.

== Battle ==
When Ali heard that Mu'awiya was sending Abd Allah ibn Mas‘ada to the Hejaz, he dispatched Al-Musayyib ibn Najabah. Al-Musayyib marched to Tayma, where they fought until the sun nearly set. Consequently, Ibn Mas‘adah and those with him fled to the fortress, while the rest escaped to Syria.

Al-Musayyib then seized the camels that were with Ibn Mas‘ada and besieged him for three days. He piled wood in front of the gate and set it on fire until the fortress began to burn. Those inside the fortress called out to Al-Musayyib that they were his own people. He then felt pity on seeing them perish, so he extinguished the fire. That night, Ibn Mas‘ada and those with him escaped to Syria.

== See also ==
- Umayyad invasions of Egypt
- Battle of Siffin

== Sources ==
- Hazleton, Lesley (2009). After the Prophet: The Epic Story of the Shia-Sunni Split in Islam. Knopf Doubleday Publishing Group. ISBN 978-0385532099.
- Madelung, Wilferd (1997). The Succession to Muhammad: A Study of the Early Caliphate. Cambridge University Press. ISBN 0-521-64696-0.
