= Expedition of Ghalib ibn Abdullah al-Laithi (Fadak) =

Date	February 628 AD, 10th Month 7 AH
Location	Fadak
Result	Successful operation; All those who came in contact with Muslims were killed, large amounts of booty captured

Commanders and leaders
Ghalib ibn Abdullah al-Laithi	Unknown

Strength
200	Entire tribe (unknown population)

Casualties and losses
None	Everyone who came into contact were killed

Expedition of Ghalib ibn Abdullah al-Laithi to Fadak took place in January 629 AD, 10th Month 7AH, of the Islamic Calendar.

== Expedition ==
Many of Muhammad's followers were killed in the Expedition of Bashir Ibn Sa’d al-Ansari (Fadak), so Muhammad sent Ghalib ibn Abdullah al-Laithi to avenge the death of his comrades. Muhammad said to Ghalib according to Ibn Sa'd:

Go to the place where the companions of Bashir Ibn Sa'd were killed
[Ibn Sa'd, Kitab al-tabaqat al-kabir, Volume 2, Pg 156]

Muhammad also said to al-Zubayr, another leader of this 200 man team:

“If Allah makes you victorious do not show leniency to them.”

[Ibn Sa'd, Kitab al-tabaqat al-kabir, Volume 2, Pg 156]

Ghalib bin ‘Abdullah at the head of 200 men was despatched to Fadak, and they successfully avenged there comrades. They killed all the rebels who fell into the hands of the Muslim force, and a captured a lot of booty (i.e. the camels were captured, which they drove back to Medina).

== See also ==
- Military career of Muhammad
- List of expeditions of Muhammad
