= Expedition of Bashir ibn Saʽd al-Anṣari (Yemen) =

Second expedition of Bashir ibn Saʽd al-Ansari
Date	February 628 AD, 10th Month 7 AH
Location	Yemen
Result	Enemy flees, large amounts of booty captured

Commanders and leaders
Bashir ibn Sa'd al-Ansari	Uyaynah ibn Hisn

Strength
300	Entire tribe (unknown population)

Casualties and losses
None	1 killed, 2 captured

The second expedition of Bashir ibn Sa'd al-Anṣari (بشير بن سعد الأنصاري), which was to Yemen, took place in February 628 AD,10th Month 7AH, of the Islamic Calendar.

In Shawwal, Saʽd Al-Ansari marched towards Yemen and Jabar on the order of Muhammad, as the commander of 300 Muslim fighters to subdue a large group of polytheists who they believed gathered to raid the outskirts of Madinah, with Uyaynah ibn Hisn. Bashir and his men used to march at night and hide during the day, until they reached their destination. Having heard about the advent of the Muslims, the polytheists fled away leaving behind them a large amount of booty, which was captured, along with 2 men who later embraced Islam on arrival to Madinah.

== See also ==
- Military career of Muhammad
- List of expeditions of Muhammad
