= Expedition of Ali ibn Abi Talib (Mudhij) =

Expedition of Ali ibn Abi Talib, to Mudhij took place in 10AH, Ramadan of the Islamic Calendar, Around December 631 AD.

== Military Expedition ==
Ali was sent in December with 300 armed horsemen, to invite the people of Yemen to Islam. Ali was instructed by Muhammad to not engage them in fighting: "go and do not look back, if you reach their place, do not fight them unless they attack you". Ali sent out his men, they obtained spoils of war, women, children, camels and flock. Once he met with the people, he invited them to Islam. They rejected him and launched an attack with arrows and rocks. Ali and his men then charged back at them and killed 20 of their men, so they fled. Ali held back the army from pursuing the fleeing enemy and invited them once more to Islam. They quickly responded and pledged allegiance to him. The tribe did this quickly and submitted themselves to Muʿādh ibn Jabal, Muhammad's envoy in Yemen.

== See also ==
- Military career of Muhammad
- List of expeditions of Muhammad
