= Conquest of Fadak =

628 military campaign in the early Muslim period

The Surrender of Fadak, also spelt Fidak, or Fidk took place in May 628 AD, 2nd month of 7AH of the Islamic calendar.

The Islamic prophet Muhammad had found out that the People of Fadak had collected in order to fight the Muslims alongside the Khaybar Jews. Therefore, he sent Ali to them.

The people of Fadak surrendered without a fight, and pleaded for a peace treaty in exchange for giving away half their land and wealth to Mohammed.

Fadak became Muhammad’s private property (a Fai), as there was no Muslim fighters involved in Fadak to share the booty with. Muhammad gave the wealth away to orphans and also used it to finance the marriage of needy young men.

== The Conquest of Fadak ==
During the time of negotiation with the Khaybar Jews, Muhammad sent Mahsia bin Masood, to send a message to the Jews of Fadak, asking them to surrender their properties and wealth or be attacked like Khaybar.

When the people of Fadak had heard of what happened to the Khaybar Jews, they were panic stricken. To spare their lives, they pleaded for a peace treaty, and in exchange requested Muhammad to take over one half of their wealth and property and banish them.

After the Khaybar Jews surrendered to Muhammad and, having lost their only source of livelihood, they requested him to employ them back on their properties for half the share of the crop. Muhammad found it much more convenient to re-employ them, as the Jews were already very experienced with their land, whereas the Muslims (the new occupiers of their land) had no experience with agriculture and cultivation. So Muhammad made some conciliation to the Khaybar Jews by re-engaging them in their lost land, but on condition that he reserved the right to banish them any time he wished. The Jews had very little choice but to agree. The same terms were applied to the Fadak Jews.

Fadak became Muhammad’s private property (a Fai), as there was no Muslim fighters involved in Fadak to share the booty with. Mohammed gave the wealth away to orphans and financed the marriage of needy young men.

The Quran verse 59:6 and 59:7 is also related to this event.

== Umar expels the Inhabitants ==
Six years later, when Umar became the Caliph of Islam, he expelled all the Jews from Kahybar and Fadak. He sent Abul Haitham Malik ibn al Taiyihan to justly work out the value of the land they own (they owned half the land), and gave back half of the value of the soil.

== Islamic primary sources ==
The Quran verse 59:6 and 59:7 is related to this event, it states the rules about Mohammeds private property (fai):

As for the gains Allah has turned over to His Messenger from them—you did not ˹even˺ spur on any horse or camel for such gains. But Allah gives authority to His messengers over whoever He wills. For Allah is Most Capable of everything.
As for gains granted by Allah to His Messenger from the people of ˹other˺ lands, they are for Allah and the Messenger, his close relatives, orphans, the poor, and ˹needy˺ travellers so that wealth may not merely circulate among your rich. Whatever the Messenger gives you, take it. And whatever he forbids you from, leave it. And fear Allah. Surely Allah is severe in punishment.

— Surah Al-Hashr 59:6-7

The famous Muslim scholar Ibn Kathir's commentary (tafsir) of the verse is as follows:

Allah the Exalted explains the regulations for Fai', the booty that the Muslims acquire from the disbelievers, without fighting them or using cavalry and camelry in war against them. ...
(What Allah gave as booty (Fai') to His Messenger from the people of the townships) meaning, from all the villages and areas that are conquered in this manner; the booty collected from them falls under the same ruling as the booty acquired from Bani An-Nadir. This is why Allah the Exalted said, (it is for Allah, His Messenger, the kindred, the orphans, the poor, and the wayfarer,) until its end and the following Ayah. mentioning the ways the Fai' should be spent. Imam Ahmad recorded that `Umar said, "The wealth of Bani An-Nadir was of the Fai' type that Allah awarded His Messenger and for which the Muslims did not have to use cavalry or camelry. Therefore, it was for the Messenger of Allah ﷺ, and he used it for the needs of his family for a year at a time, and the rest was used to buy armors and weapons used in the cause of Allah the Exalted and Most Honored." Ahmad collected the short form of this story.

— Tafsir Ibn Kathir 59:7

The event is also mentioned in the Sunni Hadith collection, Sahih al-Bukhari as follows:

Narrated `Aisha: Fatima and Al-`Abbas came to Abu Bakr, claiming their inheritance of the Prophet's land of Fadak and his share from Khaibar. Abu Bakr said, "I heard the Prophet saying, 'Our property is not inherited, and whatever we leave is to be given in charity. But the family of Muhammad can take their sustenance from this property.' By Allah, I would love to do good to the Kith and kin of Allah's Apostle rather than to my own Kith and kin."

— Sahih al-Bukhari 4035

== See also ==
- Muhammad as a general
