= Expedition of Ali ibn Abi Talib (Hamdan) =

Expedition of Ali ibn Abi Talib, to convert the people of Yemen to Islam, took place in 10AH or 631 AD.

== Military Expedition ==
According to Ar-Rahīq al-Makhtum (the Sealed Nectar), a modern Islamic hagiography of Muhammad written by the Indian Muslim author Saif ur-Rahman Mubarakpuri, Khalid ibn al-Walid was appointed with the people of Hamdan to call them to Islam. He stayed with them for 6 months but they did not convert. Then Muhammad dispatched Ali ibn Abi Talib and Khalid came back to Muhammad. Ali called them to embrace Islam (and communicated a message from Muhammad to them), and they responded and embraced Islam. Ali then wrote to Muhammad about his success, to which Muhammad replied "Peace be upon Hamdan, Peace be upon Hamdan". Khalid ibn al-Walid was not able to convert the people of Hamdan in 6 months, but Ali reportedly managed to convert all the people of Hamdan in 1 day.

== Islamic Primary sources ==
The event is mentioned by the Muslim jurist Tabari, he wrote:

al-Bara b. Azib: The Messenger of God sent Khalid b. al-Walid to the people of the Yemen inviting them to Islam, and I was among those who went with him. He persisted in the matter for six months, but they did not respond, so the Messenger of God sent 'Ali b. Abi Talib and ordered him that Khalid and those who were with him should return, but if any of them would like to follow him he should allow them. Al-Bara' said, "I was one who followed 'Ali, and as we reached the borders of the Yemen the people got the news. They gathered around him and 'Ali led us in the morning prayer. When he had finished [the prayer], he lined us up in one row. Then he moved before us, praised and extolled God, then read to them the letter of the Messenger of God. All of Hamdan embraced Islam in one day, and he wrote to the Messenger of God about it. When the Prophet read 'Ali's letter he fell down, prostrating himself to God. Then he sat up and said, 'Peace be upon Hamdan, Peace be upon Hamdan' [After the conversion of Hamdan] the people of the Yemen followed in succession with their acceptance of Islam.

== See also ==
- Military career of Muhammad
- List of expeditions of Muhammad
