= Ayn al-Tamr =

City in Karbala Governorate, Iraq

Ayn al-Tamr عين التمر
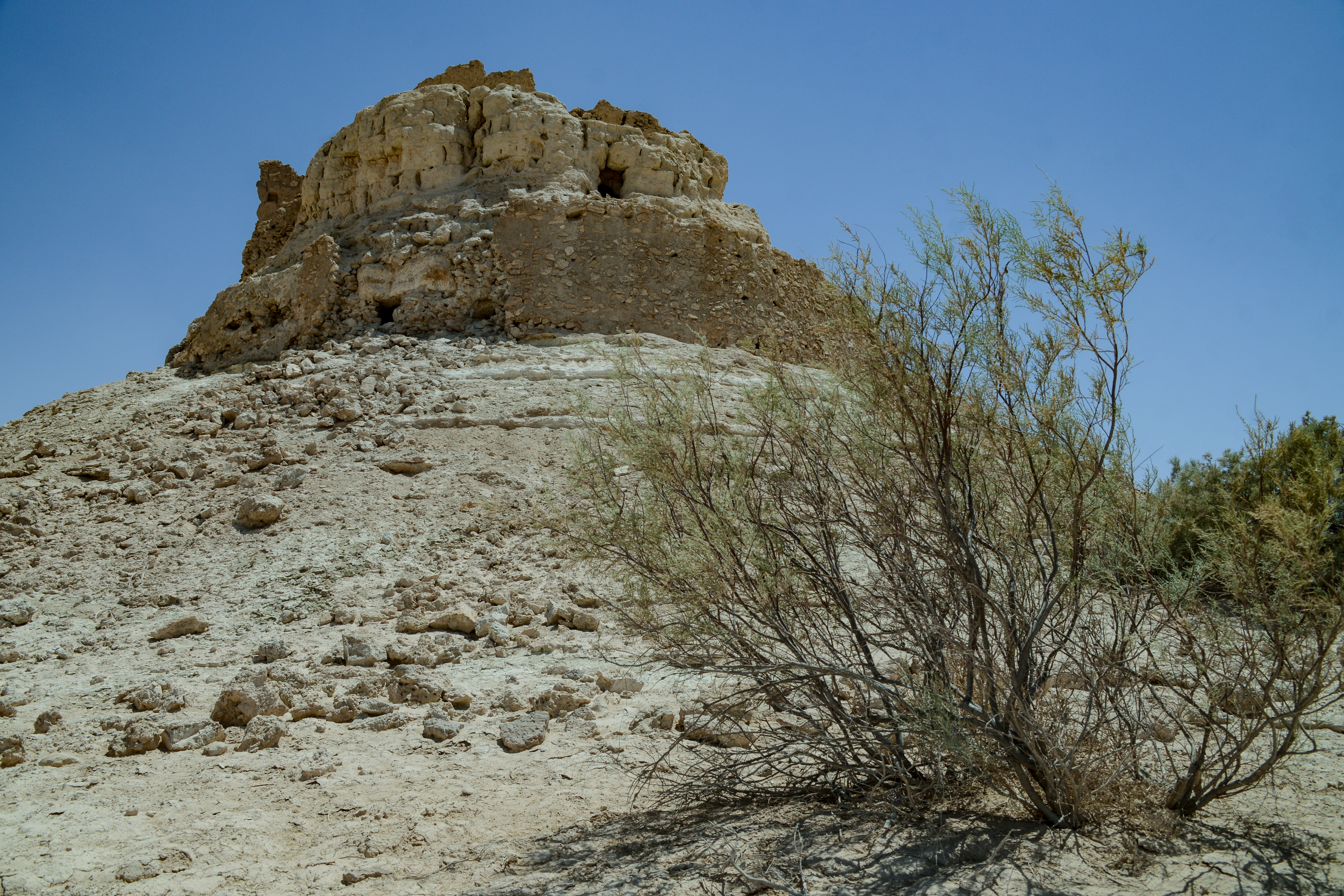

- Location within Iraq
- Coordinates: 32°33′58.0″N 43°29′25.4″E
- Country: Iraq
- Governorate: Karbala
- Districts: Ain Al-Tamur

Ayn al-Tamr or Ain al-Tamur (Arabic: عين التمر) is a city in central Iraq, located about 67 km west of Karbala near Razzaza Lake. The oasis of Ayn al-Tamr comprises many villages which are famous for palm orchards and mineral water. The city is considered one of the main sources of dates that made it an important hub on the route of Hajj in ancient times.

== Background ==
The city was originally known as Ŝeṯâṯa or Ŝefâṯa, which means "clear water" or "pure spring" in ancient Aramaic, until 1938 when it was renamed to Ayn al-Tamr, best known as the location of the Battle of Ayn al-Tamr (633).

The region contains many ancient palaces and monasteries, such as Al-Ukhaidir Fortress, Bardawil Castle, Shimon ibn Jaber Palace, and Al-Aqiser Church (Mini-Palace Church) which is one of the oldest churches in the Middle East.

== Notable people ==
- Ibn Ishaq, a Muslim historian and hagiographer.
- Hasan of Basra, a well-known Muslim preacher, theologian, scholar.
- Ibn Sirin, a Muslim mystic and interpreter of dreams.
- Abu-l-'Atahiya, an Arab poet.
- Muhsin Mahdi, a leading authority on Arabian history, philology, and philosophy.
