= Expedition of Ali ibn Abi Talib (Fadak) =

Expedition of Fadak
Date	December 627 AD in 8th month, 6 AH
Location	Fadak
Result	Victory for Ali: Banu Bakr tribe members flee; Muslims capture 500 camels and 2000 goats as booty

Commanders and leaders
Ali ibn Abi Talib	Wabr bin ‘Aleem (defected)

Strength
200	Unknown

Casualties and losses
Unknown	1 captured

Expedition of Fadak, also spelt Fidak, took place in December, 627AD, 6AH, 8th month of the Islamic Calendar

Ali ibn Abi Talib was dispatched as the Commander of a platoon to the habitation of Bani Sa‘d bin Bakr in a place called Fadak. Muhammad had received some intelligence that the Banu Bakr had rallied ranks to support the Jews of Khaybar.

The Muslim fighters used to march in the day and lurk at night. On their way, they captured an enemy scout who admitted being sent to Khaibar tribe, to offer them support in return for their dates. ‘Ali and his companions raided their encampment, captured 500 camels and 2000 goats, but the Banu Sa‘d bin Bakr tribe, with their chieftain Wabr bin ‘Aleem had fled away.

== See also ==
- Military career of Muhammad
- List of expeditions of Muhammad
