= Expedition of Bashir ibn Saʽd al-Anṣari (Fadak) =

Expedition of Bashir ibn Saʽd al-Ansari
Date	December 628 AD, Shaban 7 AH
Location	Fadak
Result	Captured a lot of camels and cattle as booty; 29 Muslims killed, Bashir injured

Commanders and leaders
Bashir ibn Sa'd al-Ansari (WIA)	Unknown

Strength
30	Entire tribe (unknown population)

Casualties and losses
29 killed (Bashir wounded)	Many Killed (unknown number)

The first expedition of Bashir ibn Saʽd al-Anṣari (بشير بن سعد الأنصاري), which was to Fadak, took place in Shaban, 7AH i.e. December 628 AD, 3rd Month 7AH, of the Islamic Calendar.

30 men with Bashir bin Saʽd Al-Ansari as the commander, headed to Fadak to confront the Banu Murrah in Sha'aban. Bashir and his men killed a large number of the enemy and seized a lot of their camels and cattle, Bashir drove off the camels and flocks. On his way back, the enemy gathered up forces and overtook the Muslims at night. They showered Basheer and his men with arrows, and killed all the Muslims except Bashir. Bashir managed to escape back to Muhammad.

== See also ==
- Military career of Muhammad
- List of expeditions of Muhammad
