= Siege of Mecca (683) =

Part of the Second Fitna

Coordinates: 21.4167°N 39.8167°E

- Part of the Second Fitna
Date	24 September – 26 November 683 CE
Location	Mecca
Result	Zubayrid victory

Belligerents
Umayyad Caliphate	Zubayrid Mecca

Commanders and leaders
Muslim ibn Uqba # Husayn ibn Numayr; Abd Allah ibn Mas'ada	Abd Allah ibn al-Zubayr; Mus'ab ibn al-Zubayr; Abd Allah ibn Muti
- Location of Mecca within modern Saudi Arabia

The siege of Mecca in September–November 683 was one of the early battles of the Second Fitna. The city of Mecca was a sanctuary for Abd Allah ibn al-Zubayr, who was among the most prominent challengers to the hereditary succession to the Caliphate by Yazid I of the Umayyad dynasty. After nearby Medina, the other holy city of Islam, also rebelled against Yazid, the Umayyad ruler sent an army to subdue the Hejaz. The Umayyad army defeated the Medinans and took the city, but Mecca held out in a month-long siege, during which the Kaaba was damaged by fire. The siege ended when news came of Yazid's sudden death. The Umayyad commander, Husayn ibn Numayr al-Sakuni, after failing to induce Ibn al-Zubayr to return with him to Syria and be recognized as Caliph, departed with his forces. Ibn al-Zubayr remained in Mecca throughout the civil war, but he was nevertheless soon acknowledged as Caliph across most of the Muslim world. It was not until 692 that the Umayyads were able to send another army, which again besieged and captured Mecca, ending the civil war.

== Background ==
Upon the death of the founder of the Umayyad Caliphate, Mu'awiya I (r. 661–680), in 680, the Muslim world was thrown into turmoil. Although Mu'awiya had named his son, Yazid I, as his heir, this choice was not universally recognized, especially by the old Medinan elites, who challenged the Umayyads' claim to keep the succession within their clan. Among them, the two chief candidates for the caliphate were Husayn ibn Ali (the grandson of Muhammad, and son of the fourth Rashidun caliph Ali), and Abd Allah ibn al-Zubayr (the grandson of the first Rashidun caliph Abu Bakr, and nephew of Muhammad's wife Aisha). To avoid being forced to acknowledge Yazid, on the latter's accession the two men fled from Medina to Mecca. Husayn made for Kufa, where his supporters awaited him to rise in revolt against the Umayyads, but his convoy was intercepted and he was killed at the Battle of Karbala in October 680, leaving Ibn al-Zubayr as the leading contender and rival for the Umayyads. As long as Yazid ruled, Ibn al-Zubayr denounced his rule from the sanctuary of Mecca but did not yet openly claim the caliphate, instead calling himself "the fugitive at the sanctuary" (al-ʿaʾidh biʾl-bayt) and insisting that the caliph should be chosen in the traditional manner, by a tribal assembly (shūrā) from among all the Quraysh, not just the Umayyads.

At first Yazid and his governors in Medina tried to negotiate with Ibn al-Zubayr, as well as the dissatisfied Ansar families. The Medinan aristocracy, however, who felt their position threatened by Mu'awiya's large-scale agricultural projects around their city, and regarded Yazid as unfit for the office of caliph due to his reputed dissolute lifestyle, led a public denunciation of their allegiance to Yazid, and expelled the Umayyad family members, some 1,000 in number (including the future caliph Marwan ibn al-Hakam and his sons), from their city. As a result, Yazid sent an army to subdue the province, and chose Muslim ibn Uqba al-Murri to lead it. Muslim's army of 12,000 Syrians overcame the Medinans' resistance at the Battle of al-Harra on 26 August 683 and proceeded to pillage Medina—one of the impious acts for which the Umayyads are denounced in later Muslim tradition. For his plundering of Medina, subsequent tradition remembers Muslim ibn Uqba as, in the words of Julius Wellhausen, the "heathen incarnate", although in the earlier sources he is represented as devout and reluctant to undertake the task assigned to him by the Caliph.

== Siege ==
After taking Medina, Muslim set out for Mecca, but on the way he fell ill and died at Mushallal, and command passed to his lieutenant Husayn ibn Numayr al-Sakuni. According to the account reported by al-Tabari, this was much against Uqba's will, but in accordance with the wishes of Yazid.

Many of the Medinans had fled to Mecca, including the commander of the Qurayshites at the battle of al-Harra, Abd Allah ibn Muti, who played a leading role in Mecca's defense. Ibn al-Zubayr was also joined by the Pro-Alid leader Mukhtar al-Thaqafi, as well as the Kharijites from Yamama (central Arabia), under the leadership of Najda ibn Amir al-Hanafi. Husayn's army arrived before Mecca in September. In a first battle, Ibn al-Zubayr proved victorious, but the Umayyads persisted, and on 24 September placed the city under siege, employing catapults to bombard it with stones.

Ibn al-Zubayr established his command post on the grounds of the Grand Mosque. On Sunday, 31 October, the Kaaba, over which a wooden structure covered with mattresses had been erected to protect it, caught fire and burned down, while the sacred Black Stone burst asunder. Many later sources ascribe the fault to the besiegers, with the result that "this siege and bombardment too figure prominently in the lists of Umayyad crimes" (G.R. Hawting), but more reliable accounts attribute the event to a torch borne by one of Ibn al-Zubayr's followers, which the wind wafted onto the building.

The siege continued for 64 days until 26 November, when news of Yazid's death (11 November) reached the besiegers. Husayn now entered into negotiations with Ibn al-Zubayr. Although the Umayyad court at Damascus promptly declared Yazid's sickly young son, Mu'awiya II, as caliph, Umayyad authority practically collapsed in the provinces and proved shaky even in the Umayyads' home province of Syria. Husayn was therefore willing to acknowledge Ibn al-Zubayr as caliph, provided that he would issue a pardon and follow him to Syria. Ibn al-Zubayr refused the last demand, since this would place him under the control of the Syrian elites, and Husayn with his army departed for Syria.

== Aftermath ==
The retreat of the Umayyad army left Ibn al-Zubayr in undisputed control of Mecca. With the collapse of Umayyad authority, he was soon acknowledged as the rightful caliph across most of the Muslim world, including northern Syria. His authority, however, remained mostly nominal. The Umayyads, under the leadership of Marwan ibn al-Hakam, managed to consolidate their position in Syria in the Battle of Marj Rahit, and even reclaimed Egypt, but an Umayyad attempt to recover control of Iraq was defeated by pro-Alid forces under Mukhtar al-Thaqafi near Mosul in August 686. Abd al-Malik, who had succeeded his father Marwan after the latter's death in April 685, thereafter restricted himself to securing his own position, while Ibn al-Zubayr's brother Mus'ab defeated Mukhtar at the Battle of Harura and gained control of all of Iraq in 687. In 691, Abd al-Malik managed to bring Zufar al-Kilabi's Qays back into the Umayyad fold, and advanced into the Iraq. Mus'ab was defeated and killed, and Umayyad authority re-established across the East. After another siege of Mecca which lasted from March–October 692, Ibn al-Zubayr was killed, and the civil war ended.

== Rebuilding of the Kaaba ==
Ibn al-Zubayr rebuilt the Ka'ba, incorporating the hatīm

After the Umayyads' departure, Ibn al-Zubayr initiated the rebuilding of the Kaaba, but most of the people, led by Ibn Abbas, had abandoned the city fearing divine retribution; it was only when Ibn al-Zubayr himself began to demolish the remains of the old building, that they were encouraged to return and aid him. Ibn al-Zubayr's reconstruction changed the original plan, incorporating modifications that Muhammad himself is reported to have intended, but which had not been carried out during Muhammad's lifetime for fear of alienating the recently converted Meccans. The new Kaaba was built entirely of stone—the old one was of alternating layers of stone and wood—and had two doors, an entrance in the east and an exit in the west. In addition, he included the semi-circular hatīm wall into the building proper. The three fragments of the Black Stone were bound in a silver frame, and placed by Ibn al-Zubayr inside the new Kaaba. After the Umayyad reconquest of the city, the hatīm was separated again from the main building, and the western gate was walled up, reverting to the general outlines of the pre-Islamic plan. This is the form in which the Kaaba has survived to this day.

== Sources ==
- Gibb, H. A. R. (1960). "ʿAbd Allāh ibn al-Zubayr". In Gibb, H. A. R.; Kramers, J. H.; Lévi-Provençal, E.; Schacht, J.; Lewis, B. & Pellat, Ch. (eds.). The Encyclopaedia of Islam, Second Edition. Volume I: A–B. Leiden: E. J. Brill. pp. 54–55. OCLC 495469456.
- Hawting, G. R., ed. (1989). The History of al-Ṭabarī, Volume XX: The Collapse of Sufyānid Authority and the Coming of the Marwānids: The Caliphates of Muʿāwiyah II and Marwān I and the Beginning of the Caliphate of ʿAbd al-Malik, A.D. 683–685/A.H. 64–66. SUNY Series in Near Eastern Studies. Albany, New York: State University of New York Press. ISBN 978-0-88706-855-3.
- Hawting, Gerald R. (2000). The First Dynasty of Islam: The Umayyad Caliphate AD 661–750 (Second ed.). London and New York: Routledge. ISBN 0-415-24072-7.
- Howard, I. K. A., ed. (1990). The History of al-Ṭabarī, Volume XIX: The Caliphate of Yazīd ibn Muʿāwiyah, A.D. 680–683/A.H. 60–64. SUNY Series in Near Eastern Studies. Albany, New York: State University of New York Press. ISBN 978-0-7914-0040-1.
- Kennedy, Hugh (2004) [1986]. The Prophet and the Age of the Caliphates: The Islamic Near East from the 6th to the 11th Century (Second ed.). Harlow: Longman. ISBN 978-0-582-40525-7.
- Lammens, H. (1987). "Yazīd b. Mu'āwiya". In Houtsma, Martijn Theodoor (ed.). E.J. Brill's first encyclopaedia of Islam, 1913–1936, Volume VIII: Ṭa'if–Zūrkhāna. Leiden: Brill. pp. 1162–1163. ISBN 90-04-08265-4.
- Wellhausen, Julius (1927). The Arab Kingdom and Its Fall. Translated by Margaret Graham Weir. Calcutta: University of Calcutta.
- Wensinck, A. J. & Jomier, J. (1978). "Ka'ba". In van Donzel, E.; Lewis, B.; Pellat, Ch. & Bosworth, C. E. (eds.). The Encyclopaedia of Islam, Second Edition. Volume IV: Iran–Kha. Leiden: E. J. Brill. pp. 317–322. ISBN 978-90-04-05745-6. OCLC 758278456.
