= Abd Allah ibn Mas'ada al-Fazari =

ʿAbd Allāh ibn Masʿada al-Fazārī (Arabic: عبد الله بن مسعدة الفزاري) (fl. 627–689) was a commander from the Arab Banu Fazara tribe who fought in the service of the Umayyad caliphs Mu'awiya I (r. 661–680) and Yazid I (r. 680–683). He also played a political role under the caliphs Marwan I (r. 684–685) and Abd al-Malik (r. 685–705).

== Origins ==
Abd Allah was a son of the Banu Fazara tribesman Mas'ada ibn Hakama ibn Malik ibn Badr (also referred to as Mas'ada ibn Hudhayfa ibn Badr by the traditional Muslim sources), who was slain in the Wadi al-Qura valley by the Muslims during a raid against the tribe by Zayd ibn al-Haritha in 627/28, ordered by the Islamic prophet Muhammad. Abd Allah, then a young boy, was taken captive during the raid and brought to Muhammad, who gave him to his daughter Fatimah as a slave. She freed Abd Allah and raised him with her husband, Muhammad's cousin Ali. He and his brother Abd al-Rahman later settled in Damascus and formed part of the Qaysi tribal nobility of the city, along with Hammam ibn Qabisa al-Numayri.

== Military career ==
Abd Allah fought in the army of Mu'awiya ibn Abi Sufyan, the Islamic governor of Syria, against the forces of Ali, who had become caliph in 656, at the Battle of Siffin in summer 657 during the First Fitna. In 659/60, Mu'awiya dispatched him at the head of 1,700 horsemen to collect the alms tax and oaths of allegiance to him from the inhabitants of the Tayma oasis and the nomadic Arabs he should come across en route and eliminate Ali's partisans who would refuse. He was joined by many of his Fazara tribesmen. To counter Abd Allah's reported raid, Ali dispatched his own Fazarite loyalist, al-Musayyab ibn Najaba. When the latter encountered Abd Allah, their forces battled for several hours, and Abd Allah was hit three times by al-Musayyab. Afterward some of his troops fled to Syria, but Abd Allah and most of his men barricaded themselves in Tayma's fort. After a three-day siege, al-Musayyab set the fort alight, but upon Abd Allah's appeal of tribal kinship, he had the fire extinguished, allowing Abd Allah's escape to Syria.

During Mu'awiya's caliphate (661–680), Abd Allah served as a commander in the wars against the Byzantine Empire. According to the historian Khalifa ibn Khayyat, Abd Allah led the annual winter raid against Anatolia in 669/70. The historians al-Waqidi and al-Ya'qubi hold that Abd Allah succeeded Sufyan ibn Awf as the Arabs' commander following his death in the raid of 672. According to the modern historian Marek Jankowiak, the traditional Muslim accounts of this episode indicate that the raid failed to achieve its objective and that Abd Allah "failed to extricate it [the Arab army] and bring it safely back home".

Abd Allah fought in the Battle of al-Harra and the Siege of Mecca in 683 as a commander of the Damascus contingent in Muslim ibn Uqba's army, which was sent by Mu'awiya's son and successor Yazid I (r. 680–683) to suppress opposition in Medina and Mecca led by Abd Allah ibn al-Zubayr.

== Later career ==
After the deaths of Yazid and his successor Mu'awiya II, Umayyad rule collapsed across the Caliphate. When Marwan ibn al-Hakam, an Umayyad from a different branch of the clan forwarded his nomination for the office in Jabiya, Abd Allah gave him his allegiance, at a time when most of the Syrian Qays backed Ibn al-Zubayr. Abd Allah lived until the time of Marwan's son and successor Abd al-Malik (r. 685–705). He advised Abd al-Malik to spare the life of Yahya ibn Sa'id, the brother of Abd al-Malik's kinsman Amr al-Ashdaq, who had been executed by the caliph in 689 after a failed coup; the caliph heeded Abd Allah's counsel.

Abd Allah's family thereafter disappeared from the historical record until 748 when Abd Allah's great-grandson Mughira ibn Abd Allah ibn Mughira, a Qaysi noble or dissident, served as Caliph Marwan II's governor of Egypt.

== Bibliography ==
- Biesterfeldt, Hinrich; Günther, Sebastian (2018). The Works of Ibn Wāḍiḥ al-Yaʿqūbī (Volume 3): An English Translation. Leiden: Brill. ISBN 978-90-04-35621-4.
- Crone, Patricia (1980). Slaves on Horses: The Evolution of the Islamic Polity (1980 ed.). Cambridge: Cambridge University Press. ISBN 978-0521229616.
- Fishbein, Michael, ed. (1990). The History of al-Ṭabarī, Volume XXI: The Victory of the Marwānids, A.D. 685–693/A.H. 66–73. SUNY Series in Near Eastern Studies. Albany, New York: State University of New York Press. ISBN 978-0-7914-0221-4.
- Fishbein, Michael, ed. (1997). The History of al-Ṭabarī, Volume VIII: The Victory of Islam: Muḥammad at Medina A.D. 626–630/A.H. 5–8. SUNY Series in Near Eastern Studies. Albany, New York: State University of New York Press. ISBN 978-0-7914-3149-8.
- Hawting, G. R., ed. (1996). The History of al-Ṭabarī, Volume XVII: The First Civil War: From the Battle of Siffīn to the Death of ʿAlī, A.D. 656–661/A.H. 36–40. SUNY Series in Near Eastern Studies. Albany, New York: State University of New York Press. ISBN 978-0-7914-2393-6.
- Jankowiak, Marek (2013). "The First Arab Siege of Constantinople". In Zuckerman, Constantin (ed.). Travaux et mémoires, Vol. 17: Constructing the Seventh Century. Paris: Association des Amis du Centre d’Histoire et Civilisation de Byzance. pp. 237–320.
- Madelung, Wilferd (1997). The Succession to Muhammad: A Study of the Early Caliphate. Cambridge: Cambridge University Press. ISBN 0-521-56181-7.
- Morony, Michael G., ed. (1987). The History of al-Ṭabarī, Volume XVIII: Between Civil Wars: The Caliphate of Muʿāwiyah, 661–680 A.D./A.H. 40–60. SUNY Series in Near Eastern Studies. Albany, New York: State University of New York Press. ISBN 978-0-87395-933-9.
