= Hubaysh ibn Dulja =

Umayyad army Commander (d. 684)

Ḥubaysh ibn Dulja al-Qaynī حبيش بْن دلجة القيني
- Died: 684
- Military career
- Allegiance: Umayyad Caliphate
- Branch: Umayyad army
- Rank: Commander

Ḥubaysh ibn Dulja al-Qaynī (Arabic: حبيش بْن دلجة القيني) (died 684) was a tribal leader of the Quda'a in Jund al-Urdunn (district of Jordan) and a commander for the Umayyad caliphs Mu'awiya I (r. 661–680), Yazid I (r. 680–683) and Marwan I (r. 684–685).

== Life ==
Hubaysh was the son of Dulja ibn Mushammit, an Arab chieftain of the Quda'a tribal confederation present in Syria and northwestern Arabia. Dulja is recorded to have visited the Islamic prophet Muhammad (d. 632) and took up residence in Syria's Jund al-Urdunn (military district of Jordan). According to his nisba (descriptive suffix), Hubaysh belonged to the Balqayn tribe, which formed part of the Quda'a confederation. Hubaysh's eldest son was Abd al-Rahman, hence his kunya 'Abu Abd al-Rahman'.

Hubaysh commanded the Jordanian Quda'a contingent of the Umayyad governor of Syria, Mu'awiya ibn Abi Sufyan, in the Battle of Siffin in 657 against the forces of Caliph Ali (r. 656–661). In the winters of 667/68 and 668/69, during the reign of Caliph Mu'awiya, he commanded or participated in raiding in the vicinity of Antioch. Under Mu'awiya's son and successor Yazid I (r. 680–683), Hubaysh led a 1,000-strong contingent of soldiers from Jordan in the army of Muslim ibn Uqba against the inhabitants of Medina at the Battle of al-Harra in 683. The army withdrew to Syria in the wake of Yazid's death, but Hubaysh was later dispatched by Caliph Marwan I at the head of an army against the forces of the anti-Umayyad caliph Abd Allah ibn al-Zubayr in 684. In the ensuing Battle of al-Rabadha to the east of Medina, Hubaysh was slain by a Persian archer, Yazid ibn Siyah al-Uswari, in the army of the Zubayrid governor of Basra, al-Harith ibn Abd Allah al-Makhzumi. Most of the Umayyad forces were killed, though among the survivors was the future viceroy of Iraq, al-Hajjaj ibn Yusuf.

Nothing is heard of Hubaysh's family until 743, when his grandsons Hakam ibn Jurw and Rashid ibn Jurw led the tribes of Jordan under Muhammad ibn Abd al-Malik, son of Caliph Abd al-Malik (r. 685–705), in revolt against Caliph Yazid III. It was suppressed by the Umayyad prince and general Sulayman ibn Hisham.

== Bibliography ==
- Biesterfeldt, Hinrich; Günther, Sebastian (2018). The Works of Ibn Wāḍiḥ al-Yaʿqūbī (Volume 3): An English Translation. Leiden: Brill. ISBN 978-90-04-35621-4.
- Crone, Patricia (1980). Slaves on Horses: The Evolution of the Islamic Polity (1980 ed.). Cambridge: Cambridge University Press. ISBN 978-0521229616.
- Hawting, G. R., ed. (1989). The History of al-Ṭabarī, Volume XX: The Collapse of Sufyānid Authority and the Coming of the Marwānids: The Caliphates of Muʿāwiyah II and Marwān I and the Beginning of the Caliphate of ʿAbd al-Malik, A.D. 683–685/A.H. 64–66. SUNY Series in Near Eastern Studies. Albany, New York: State University of New York Press. ISBN 978-0-88706-855-3.
