= Ibn Jarir =

Ibn Jarir may refer to:

- al-Tabari (839–923), fully Muhammad ibn Jarir al-Tabari, Muslim historian from Tabaristan
- Wahb ibn Jarir (died 822), Muslim traditionist from Basra
- Yahya ibn Jarir (fl. 1058–1103), Syriac Orthodox physician and scholar from Iraq
- Yazid ibn Jarir al-Qasri, Abbasid governor of Yemen in 812–813
