= Battle of al-Harra =

Battle between Umayyad and Medinan forces in 683

- Part of the Second Fitna
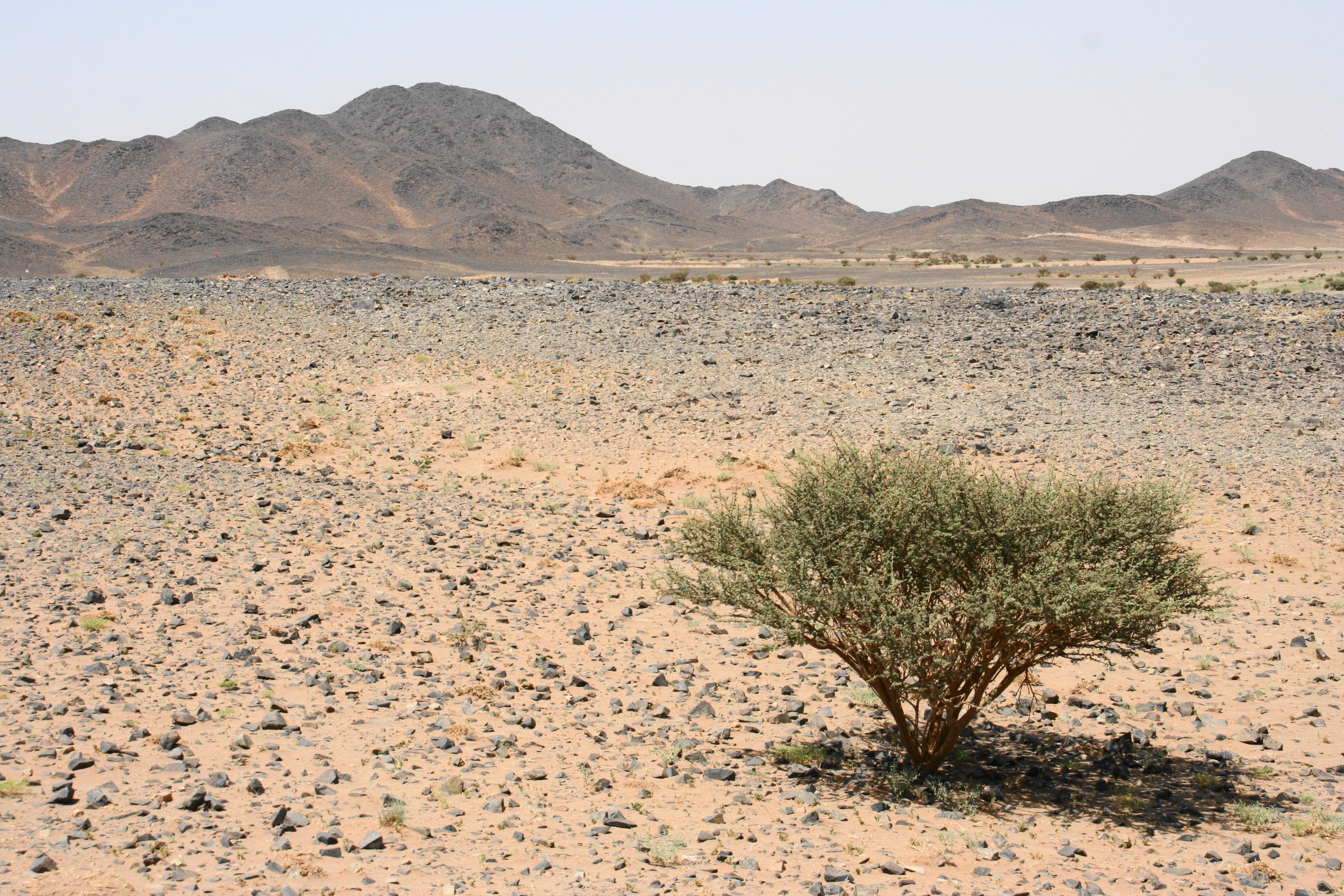
- The battle was fought just north of Medina on terrain similar to this patch of basaltic, stony desert in the city's environs
Date	26 August 683
Location	Harrat Waqim, northeastern outskirts of Medina 24°29′22″N 39°43′40″E
Result	Umayyad victory

Belligerents
Umayyad Caliphate; Syrian army; Umayyad partisans	Medinese Opposition; Ansar; Quraysh

Commanders and leaders
Muslim ibn Uqba; Husayn ibn Numayr; Marwan ibn al-Hakam; Rawh ibn Zinba; Abd Allah ibn Mas'ada; Hubaysh ibn Dulja; Zufar ibn al-Harith	Abd Allah ibn Hanzala †; Abd Allah ibn Muti; Yazid ibn Hurmuz; Muhammad ibn Sa'd; Ma'qil ibn Sinan (executed)

Strength
4,000–12,000	2,000

Casualties and losses
Unknown	180–700 Ansar and Quraysh
- Location of the battle within modern Saudi Arabia

The Battle of al-Harra (Arabic: يوم الحرة, romanized: Yawm al-Ḥarra, lit. 'Day of al-Harra') was fought between the Umayyad army of the caliph Yazid I (r. 680–683) led by Muslim ibn Uqba and the defenders of Medina from the Ansar and Muhajirun factions, who had rebelled against the caliph. The battle took place at the lava field of Harrat Waqim in the northeastern outskirts of Medina on 26 August 683 and lasted less than a day.

The elite factions of Medina disapproved of the hereditary succession of Yazid (unprecedented in Islamic history until that point), resented the caliph's impious lifestyle, and chafed under Umayyad economic acts and policies. After declaring their rebellion, they besieged the Umayyad clan resident in Medina and dug a defensive trench around the city. The expeditionary force sent by Yazid and local Umayyads, who had since been released from the siege, encamped at Harrat Waqim, where the rebels confronted them. Despite an initial advantage, the Medinans were routed due to the defection of one of their factions, the Banu Haritha, which enabled Umayyad horse riders led by Marwan ibn al-Hakam to attack them from the rear.

Afterward, the army pillaged Medina for three days, though accounts of the plunder vary considerably. The Syrian army proceeded to besiege the rebel leader Abd Allah ibn al-Zubayr in Mecca, though Ibn Uqba died en route. In contrast to Ibn al-Zubayr's call for a shura to decide the caliphate and his success in resisting the Umayyads, the rebels in Medina lacked a political program and military experience. The traditional Islamic sources list the Battle of al-Harra and its aftermath as one of the Umayyads' 'major crimes' and malign Ibn Uqba for his role in the plunder of Medina.

== Location ==
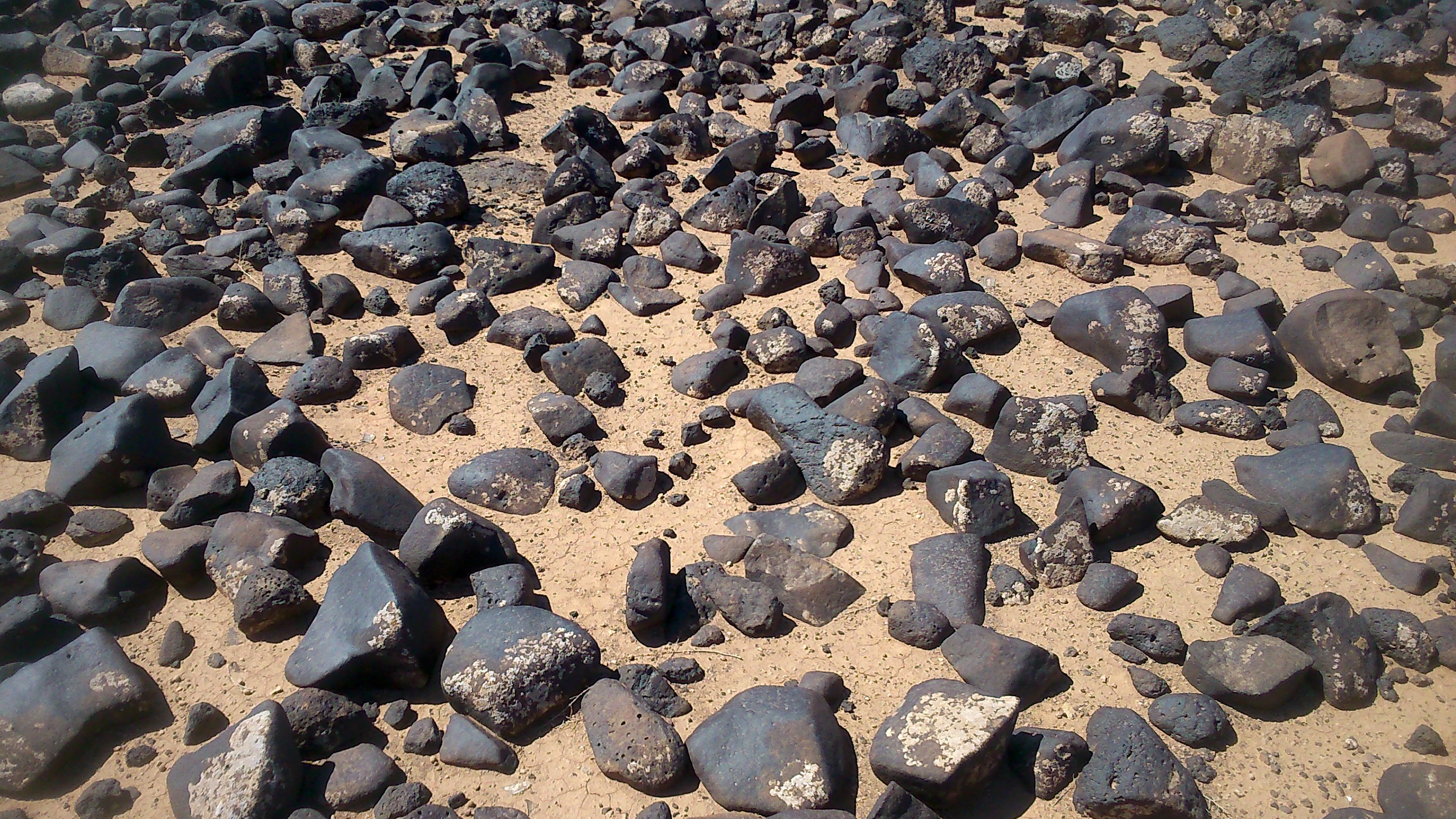
Basaltic stony ground of the eastern desert of modern Jordan, characteristic of the wider region of ḥarras that extend from the Hauran into western Arabia

The location of the battle was the lava field of Harrat Waqim, which straddles the eastern outskirts of Medina in the Hejaz (western Arabia). It was named after the Waqim fortress of the Banu Qurayza tribe that had been resident in the area during the pre-Islamic period and was alternatively known as Harrat Bani Qurayza or Harrat Zuhra. It formed part of the vast geological system of ḥarras (basaltic deserts) which spanned the region east of the Hauran in Syria southward to Medina's environs. As a result of the fame of the battle, Harrat Waqim was thenceforth referred to in Muslim sources as 'the Harra'.

== Background ==
Under the Islamic prophet Muhammad, beginning in 622, and the first three caliphs, Abu Bakr (r. 632–634), Umar (r. 634–644) and Uthman (r. 644–656), Medina served as the capital of the early Muslim state, which by Uthman's time came to rule over an empire spanning Arabia, most of the Persian Sasanian Empire and the Byzantine territories of Syria and Egypt. The capital was moved to Kufa in Iraq by the fourth Rashidun caliph Ali (r. 656–661) during the First Fitna. Ali's rival, Mu'awiya ibn Abi Sufyan, the long-time governor of Syria, ultimately won the civil war and established the Umayyad Caliphate with its seat in Damascus in 661.

=== Political and pious opposition to Yazid ===
The hereditary succession of Mu'awiya's son, Yazid, in 680 was an unprecedented act in Islamic politics. It was a point of contention among the people of Medina, especially the eminent Muslim leaders of the Hejaz. One of them, Husayn, a son of Ali and grandson of Muhammad, left Medina to lead a revolt against Yazid in Iraq. He was slain alongside his band of about seventy followers at the Battle of Karbala by the forces of the Umayyad governor Ubayd Allah ibn Ziyad; Yazid is alleged to have put the head of Husayn on display in Damascus.

In 680, Yazid dismissed his cousin al-Walid ibn Utba ibn Abi Sufyan from the governorship of Medina for having failed to prevent Husayn and the other major opponent to his rule, Abd Allah ibn al-Zubayr, a grandson of Abu Bakr, from leaving Medina. Al-Walid's replacement, the Umayyad Amr ibn Sa'id al-Ashdaq, failed to capture Ibn al-Zubayr, who took refuge in the Kaaba in Mecca, or extract from him the oath of allegiance to Yazid. Al-Ashdaq mobilized a troop of Medinans enrolled in the army, as well as mawali (sing. mawla; non-Arab, Muslim freedmen or clients) of the Umayyad clan, to subdue Ibn al-Zubayr, but many of the recruited Medinans were reticent to participate and paid others to fight in their place. Ibn al-Zubayr defeated this force, and partly as a consequence, Yazid dismissed al-Ashdaq and reappointed al-Walid ibn Utba in August 681. Feigning an attempted reconciliation with the caliph, Ibn al-Zubayr requested that Yazid replace al-Walid ibn Utba with a milder governor. Yazid acceded, installing his young and politically inexperienced cousin Uthman ibn Muhammad ibn Abi Sufyan in December 682.

Most of the Medinans, and many in the wider Muslim community, sympathized with Ibn al-Zubayr amid general uncertainty about the stability of Umayyad rule and the prospect of Ibn al-Zubayr coming to power. Reports of impious behavior by Yazid, including entertainment by singing girls and a pet monkey, contributed to prevailing attitudes in Medina of his unsuitability as caliph. The Medinans mainly consisted of the Ansar (native Medinans who had hosted and allied with Muhammad after his emigration from Mecca in 622) and the Muhajirun (Muhammad's early supporters who had emigrated with him). The Muhajirun were predominantly from the Quraysh, the tribe to which Muhammad, Ali, and the Umayyads all belonged. At the time of the opposition to Yazid, the Medinans were mostly the children of these two factions, which collectively represented Islam's first military generation, and felt threatened at the potential loss of the inherited military pensions brought about by Umayyad fiscal reforms. The reforms called for pensions to be given only in exchange for active military service.

To reconcile with the Medinans, Yazid requested they send a delegation to his court in Damascus. Uthman ibn Muhammad organized the Medinan embassy. Yazid attempted to win over the delegates by lavishing them with gifts and money. This proved fruitless when the delegates returned and incited the people of Medina with accounts detailing Yazid's scandalous lifestyle. The most vociferous critic among the delegates was Abd Allah ibn Hanzala. He declared that he and his sons would fight against Yazid should others not join him, and though Yazid respected him, he would use the gifts the latter gave him against the caliph. Ibn al-Zubayr took control of Mecca in September 683 and allied with Ibn Hanzala in opposition to Yazid. The leaders of the Medinan opposition dismissed counsel from Yazid's messengers and friends in Damascus to avoid rebellion as attempts to undermine the unity of the Medinans. Prominent exceptions to this united bloc included the Alids (family of Ali), Abd Allah ibn Umar, son of the second caliph, and the companion of Muhammad, Abu Barza. They considered the anti-Umayyad opposition in the Hejaz to be fighting for power and wealth rather than for a just and pious cause.

=== Economic and social grievances ===
Mu'awiya had acquired extensive properties and agricultural estates in Medina from its inhabitants. These lands were referred to as sawafi in the sources, a term usually reserved for conquered lands that became state property, but in the case of Medina meant acquired lands that became the personal domains of the caliph. According to reports cited by the 9th-century historian Ibn Qutayba, the people of Medina alleged that Mu'awiya purchased the lands at a hundredth of their value during hunger and desperation. The 9th-century historian al-Ya'qubi held that the properties were confiscated. The people of Medina considered the acquisitions illegitimate and damaging to their economic interests.

Mu'awiya launched cultivation and irrigation projects on the lands and derived considerable returns from dates and wheat. To meet the workforce needs for cultivation and maintenance, Mu'awiya employed numerous mawali, consisting of war captives from the conquered provinces, including many skilled laborers. The mawali were loyal to their patron, in this case, Mu'awiya and later Yazid. The mawali of the Umayyads in Medina were numerous, and the sources record several instances of tensions involving them and the people of Medina. Yazid inherited the estates and mawali of his father. The dispossessed landowners of Medina demanded the restitution of their ownership rights from Yazid. The historian Meir Jacob Kister asserts the Medinan rebellion emanated from "the conflict between the owners of estates and property in Medina and the unjust Umayyad rulers who robbed them of their property".

== Prelude ==
Uthman ibn Muhammad was unable to control the growing opposition to Umayyad rule. According to the historian al-Mada'ini (d. 843), the inaugurating act of rebellion by the Medinans occurred during a gathering in the mosque where the attendees each tossed an article of clothing, such as a turban or a shoe, an Arab custom symbolizing a severing of ties, to renounce their allegiance to Yazid. According to the historian Abu Mikhnaf (d. 774), the first act of rebellion by the Medinans was giving allegiance to Ibn Hanzala. Afterward, they assaulted the Umayyads and their supporters in the city, together about 1,000-strong, who fled to the quarter of their leading elder, Marwan ibn al-Hakam. The latter sent urgent requests for assistance from Yazid, who dispatched an army to suppress the opposition from both the Medinans and Ibn al-Zubayr.

According to alternative accounts by al-Ya'qubi and al-Waqidi (d. 823), for up to a month leading to the battle, several attempts by the chief of Yazid's estates in Medina, Ibn Mina, to collect the crops for the caliph were disrupted by the estates' former owners, in particular from the Ansarite Banu al-Harith clan. Uthman ibn Muhammad responded by assigning a guard force to help Ibn Mina and his men gather the crops. They were met by a group of Ansar and Quraysh, who refused to allow the Umayyads' men to proceed with their work. Uthman ibn Muhammad then requested intervention by Yazid, who dispatched an expedition against the townspeople of Medina. In these accounts, the Medinans expelled and pelted the Umayyads with stones in response to Uthman ibn Muhammad's rebukes to their leaders for barring the caliph's men from the estates.

The caliph's expeditionary force consisted of 4,000 to 12,000 well-equipped Syrian Arab tribesmen, dominated by the Banu Kalb. As an incentive to the troops, who anticipated an arduous campaign ahead, each soldier was paid 100 silver dirhams over their regular stipend. Yazid's initial choice for the commander of this force, al-Ashdaq, refused the position out of a principle not to shed the blood of his fellow Quraysh, while Ibn Ziyad, still reeling from the fallout from his role in the death of Husayn, also refused. Instead, the loyal, elderly, non-Qurayshite veteran Muslim ibn Uqba was given the command. According to al-Ya'qubi, Ibn Uqba's forces were composed of equal numbers of troops from the five junds ('armies') of Syria: Rawh ibn Zinba al-Judhami led the men of Palestine, Hubaysh ibn Dulja al-Qayni led the men of Jordan, Abd Allah ibn Mas'ada al-Fazari led the men of Damascus, Husayn ibn Numayr al-Sakuni led the men of Homs and Zufar ibn al-Harith al-Kilabi led the men of Qinnasrin.

Upon hearing of the Syrian advance, the Medinans reinforced the siege against the Umayyads of Medina before allowing them to leave after they gave oaths not to assist the incoming army. On their way to Syria, the exiled Umayyads encountered Ibn Uqba's army in the Wadi al-Qura region between Syria and Medina. Ibn Uqba's inquiries about Medina's defenses were rebuffed by most of the Umayyads, some of whom continued on their way north, but Marwan's son Abd al-Malik cooperated and offered valuable intelligence. Under Marwan's leadership, most of the exiles joined the expedition. In Medina, the defenders, numbering about 2,000 men, dug a trench to protect a vulnerable northern corner of the city and divided themselves into four units, two of which were commanded by members of the Quraysh, including Abd Allah ibn Muti, one by Ibn Hanzala of the Ansar and the last by a non-Qurayshite and non-Ansarite, Ma'qil ibn Sinan al-Ashja'i.

For three days, starting on 23 August, Ibn Uqba attempted negotiations with the Medinan leaders. He appealed for unity and promised two annual payments to the Medinans from Yazid and a significant price reduction on corn. Yazid may have offered these or similar terms before the expedition to a representative of the Medinans, Ali's nephew Abd Allah ibn Ja'far. According to the historian Laura Veccia Vaglieri, this indicates that economic concerns contributed to the Medinan opposition of the Umayyads.

== Battle ==
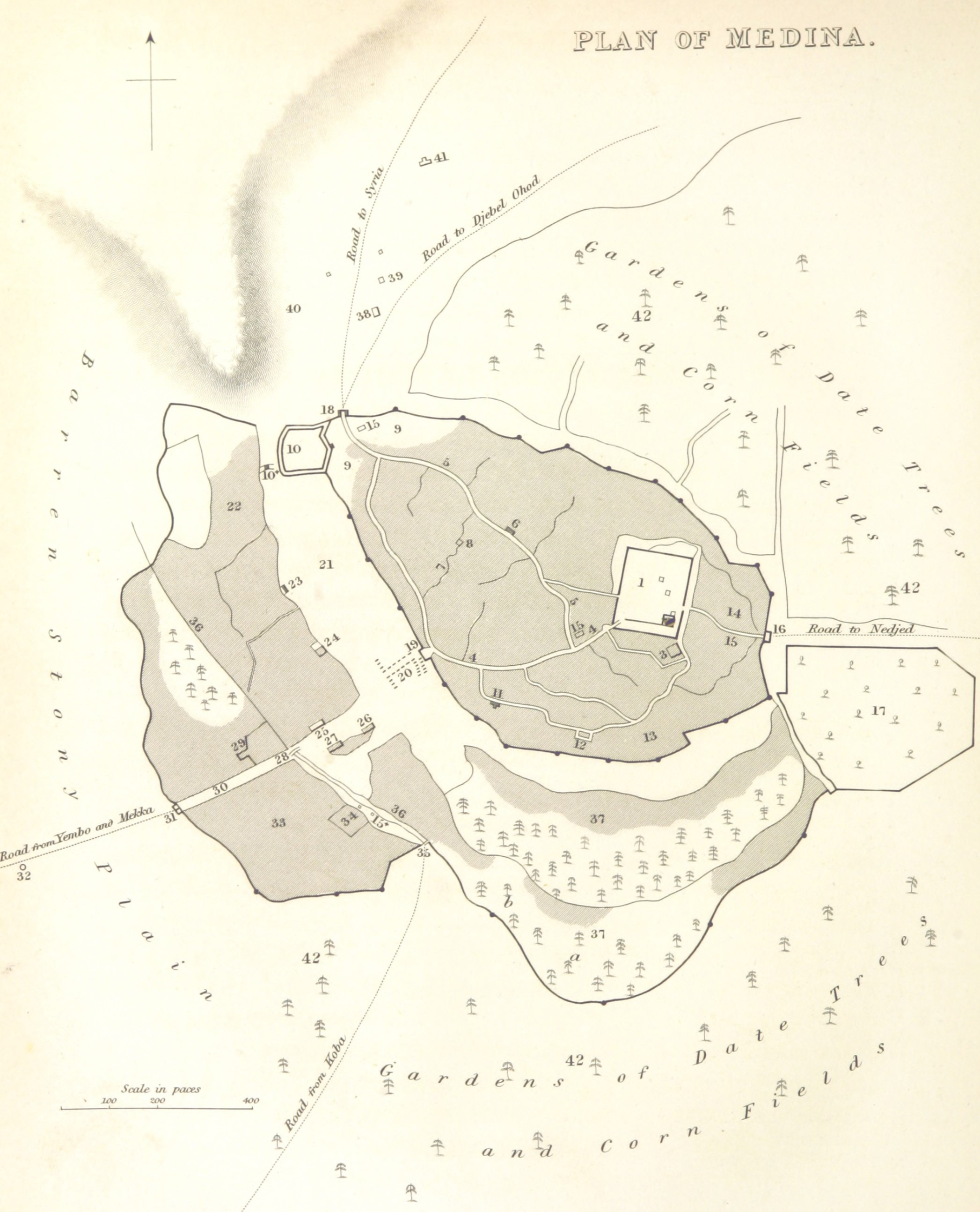
Plan of Medina in the early 19th century

The negotiations between Ibn Uqba and the Medinans faltered, and clashes ensued. The Medinan horsemen marched against Ibn Uqba in the Harra, and may have advanced as far as Ibn Uqba's litter, from which he commanded his troops. Upon their approach, Ibn Uqba confronted them on horseback and actively participated in the fighting. The Medinans gained an early advantage, but were ultimately overtaken by the Syrians and several Ansarite and Qurayshite notables were slain, including Ibn Hanzala, eight of his sons and a handful of other men from the Medinan elite.

Squadrons of Medinan mawali, fighting under the command of the mawla Yazid ibn Hurmuz, defended a large section of the ditch, and held off an assault by the Syrians, refusing demands to surrender. The historians Wahb ibn Jarir (d. 822) and al-Samhudi (d. 1533) held that Medinan lines were compromised by the defection of the Banu Haritha, whose members gave Marwan and his horse riders access through their quarter in Medina, enabling them to assault the Medinans at the Harra from the rear. The Quraysh under Ibn Muti fled the battlefield and headed for safety to Ibn al-Zubayr in Mecca. According to al-Waqidi, the battle concluded on 26 August 683. The fighting lasted less than a day.

== Aftermath ==
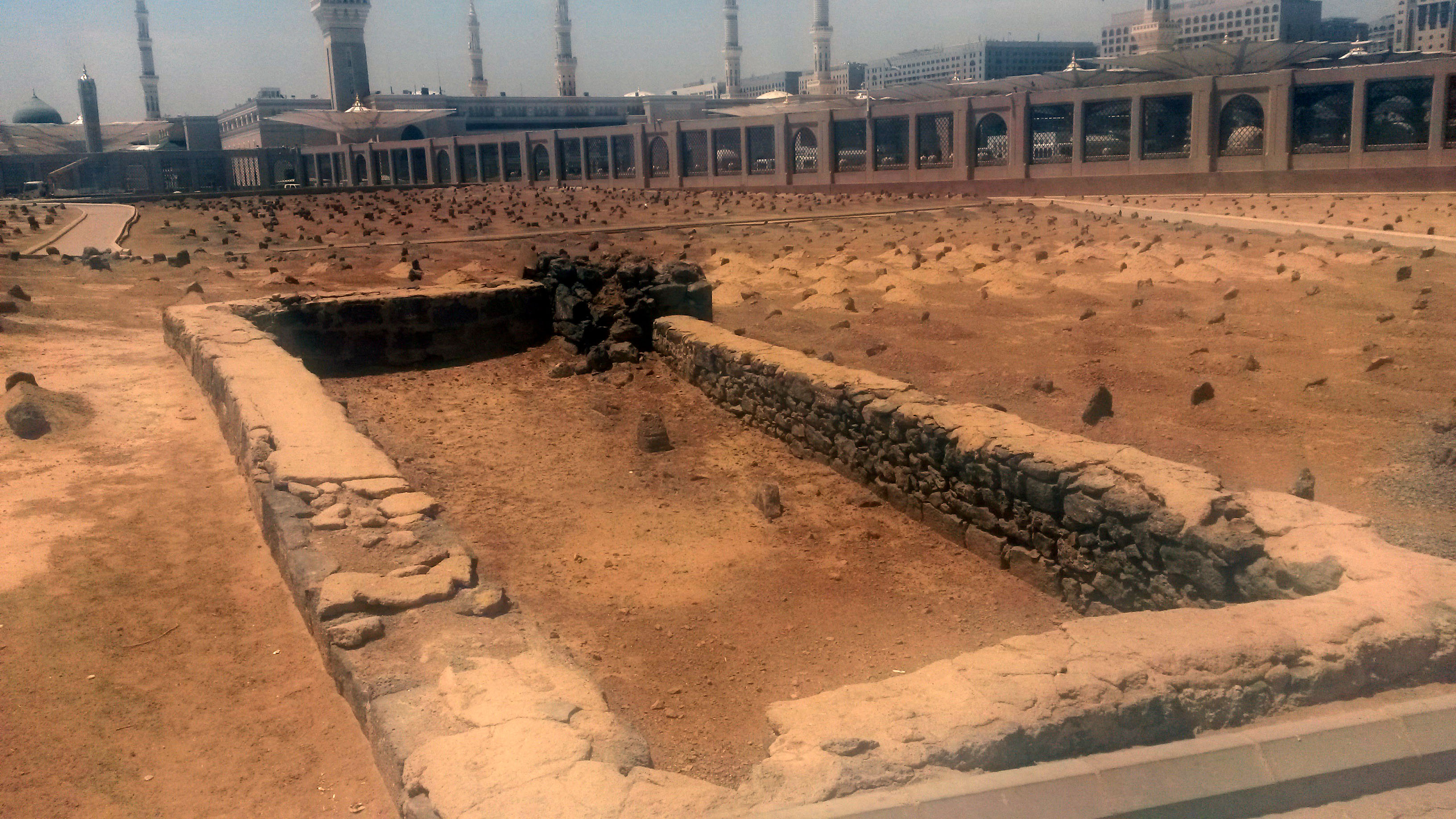
Baqi Grave for al-Harra Victim

Conflicting accounts abound regarding the aftermath of the Syrian victory. According to Abu Mikhnaf and al-Samhudi, Ibn Uqba allowed his troops to pillage Medina for three days. The number of Medinan casualties incurred during the battle and immediate aftermath range from 180 to 700 members of the Ansar and Quraysh, and 4,000 to 10,000 other Medinans. Al-Samhudi further claimed that as a result of the alleged rape of Medinan women by Ibn Uqba's troops, 1,000 illegitimate children were later born by them as a result.

The account of the historian Awana ibn al-Hakam (d. 764) describes a more orderly capture, in which Ibn Uqba summoned the notables of Medina to give allegiance to Yazid at the Quba Mosque and used the occasion to execute several prominent leaders of the opposition movement, including a number from the Quraysh and Ma'qil ibn Sinan al-Ashja'i. The latter had been a close friend and belonged to the same Ghatafan tribal grouping as Ibn Uqba but was nonetheless executed for his disavowal of Yazid. Amr ibn Uthman, a son of Caliph Uthman (r. 644–656) and a member of the Umayyad clan, had his beard cut as punishment for suspected collusion with the Medinans, although Ali al-Sajjad, a son of Husayn ibn Ali, was well-treated on the personal instructions of Yazid. Wahb ibn Jarir likewise did not make a note of a three-day plunder of Medina, and Wellhausen doubts that it occurred.

The accounts of Abu Mikhnaf and Awana agree that following the ordering of affairs in Medina, Ibn Uqba left to subdue Ibn al-Zubayr in Mecca but fell ill and died on the way in al-Mushallal. As ordered by Yazid, he left as second-in-command Husayn ibn Numayr al-Sakuni, who proceeded to besiege Mecca in September.

== Assessment ==
In Kister's observation, the rebellion in Medina lacked a political program, in contrast to the revolt of Ibn al-Zubayr, who called for a shura (consultation) to decide the caliphate. The Medinans also divided their command by naming separate leaders for the Quraysh and the Ansar, which drew criticism from Abd Allah ibn Abbas over having two leaders. The Medinans felt assured of victory in any confrontation with the Syrians. In organizing the defense of their city, they emulated Muhammad's tactic from the Battle of the Trench, where he repulsed a siege against Medina by digging ditches to prevent the entry of enemy horsemen. At al-Harra, the Medinans lacked horses and weapons of their own, as indicated by counsel Marwan gave to Ibn Uqba, where he further advised that the Medinans were not warlike and few would have the resolve to fight. The survivors among Medina's leaders lamented the quick defeat of their pious men at the Harra, contrasting it to the successful six-month resistance against the Syrian army by Ibn al-Zubayr and his smaller coterie of supporters in Mecca. Kister considers the release of the besieged Umayyads, instead of their effective use as hostages, "heedless" and the rebels' belief that the Umayyads would not aid the Syrians or convince them to turn back "credulous".

The alleged cruelty against the townspeople of Medina by the Umayyad army became a cause célèbre that was invoked by future generations. Ibn Uqba was thenceforth known as 'Musrif', a play on his name 'Muslim', which meant "he who exceeds all bounds of propriety". The historian Michael Lecker considers the reports of Syrian atrocities in Medina as "undeniably anti-Umayyad and probably exaggerated". Moreover, Wellhausen dismisses the depiction by later Muslim and western sources of Ibn Uqba as a brutal heathen with a deep hatred for Islam, in general, and the people of Medina, in particular, as a falsity that developed over time and is unsupported by the early and more credible Muslim sources. In Wellhausen's assessment, the suppression of the Medinan revolt was not the cause of the significant decline of the city's political status; this had already been precipitated by the assassination of Caliph Uthman in 656, the aftermath of which marked Medina's end as the capital of the nascent Muslim state. The city continued to be a center for religious scholarship, Arab high culture, and a redoubt for poets and singers. Vaglieri counters Wellhausen's doubts about the extent of the pillage, asserting that the "[traditional Muslim] sources are unanimous on this point".

== Sources ==
- Andersson, Tobias (2018). Early Sunnī Historiography: A Study of the Tārīkh of Khalīfa b. Khayyāṭ. Leiden: Brill. ISBN 978-90-04-38317-3.
- Anthony, Sean W. (2016). "The Meccan Prison of ʿAbdallāh b. al-Zubayr and the Imprisonment of Muḥammad b. al-Ḥanafiyya". In Pomerantz, Maurice A.; Shahin, Aram A. (eds.). The Heritage of Arabo-Islamic Learning: Studies Presented to Wadad Kadi. Leiden and Boston: Brill. pp. 3–27. ISBN 978-90-04-30590-8.
- Biesterfeldt, Hinrich; Günther, Sebastian (2018). The Works of Ibn Wāḍiḥ al-Yaʿqūbī (Volume 3): An English Translation. Leiden: Brill. ISBN 978-90-04-35621-4.
- Gibb, H. A. R. (1960). "ʿAbd Allāh ibn al-Zubayr". In Gibb, H. A. R.; Kramers, J. H.; Lévi-Provençal, E.; Schacht, J.; Lewis, B. & Pellat, Ch. (eds.). The Encyclopaedia of Islam, Second Edition. Volume I: A–B. Leiden: E. J. Brill. pp. 54–55. OCLC 495469456.
- Hawting, Gerald R. (2000). The First Dynasty of Islam: The Umayyad Caliphate AD 661–750 (Second ed.). London and New York: Routledge. ISBN 0-415-24072-7.
- Howard, I. K. A., ed. (1990). The History of al-Ṭabarī, Volume XIX: The Caliphate of Yazīd ibn Muʿāwiyah, A.D. 680–683/A.H. 60–64. SUNY Series in Near Eastern Studies. Albany, New York: State University of New York Press. ISBN 978-0-7914-0040-1.
- Kister, M. J. (1977). "The Battle of the Ḥarra: Some Socio-Economic Aspects". In Myriam Rosen Ayalon (ed.). Studies in Memory of Gaston Wiet. Jerusalem: Institute of Asian and African Studies. pp. 33–49.
- Lassner, Jacob (1986). Islamic Revolution and Historical Memory: An Inquiry Into the Art of ʻAbbāsid Apologetics. American Oriental Society. ISBN 978-0-940490-66-6.
- Lecker, Michael (1985). "Muhammad at Medina – A Geographical Approach". Jerusalem Studies in Arabic and Islam. 6: 29–62.
- Lecker, Michael (2011). "The Jewish Reaction to the Islamic Conquests". In Krech, Volkhard; Steinicke, Marion (eds.). Dynamics in the History of Religions Between Asia and Europe: Encounters, Notions, and Comparative Perspectives. Brill. ISBN 978-90-04-18500-5.
- Lewis, B.; Ménage, V. L.; Pellat, Ch. & Schacht, J., eds. (1971). "Ḥarra". The Encyclopaedia of Islam, Second Edition. Volume III: H–Iram. Leiden: E. J. Brill. p. 226. OCLC 495469525.
- Smith, G. Rex, ed. (1994). The History of al-Ṭabarī, Volume XIV: The Conquest of Iran, A.D. 641–643/A.H. 21–23. SUNY Series in Near Eastern Studies. Albany, New York: State University of New York Press. ISBN 978-0-7914-1293-0.
- Vaglieri, L. Veccia (1971). "Al-Ḥarra". In Lewis, B.; Ménage, V. L.; Pellat, Ch. & Schacht, J. (eds.). The Encyclopaedia of Islam, Second Edition. Volume III: H–Iram. Leiden: E. J. Brill. pp. 226–227. OCLC 495469525.
- Wellhausen, Julius (1927). The Arab Kingdom and Its Fall. Translated by Margaret Graham Weir. Calcutta: University of Calcutta.
