= Yazid ibn Hurmuz =

Yazīd ibn Hurmuz al-Fārisī was the chief of the Umayyad mawali in Medina, but led the city's mawali against the Umayyad army at the Battle of al-Harra in 683.

== Life ==
Yazid ibn Hurmuz was a Persian mawla (client or freedman) of the Umayyad clan and chief of clan's mawali in Medina during the reign of the Umayyad caliph Yazid I (r. 680–683). His brother Abd Allah ibn Hurmuz was a chief of the Umayyads' mawali in Kufa during the reign of Yazid I's father, Caliph Mu'awiya I (r. 661–680). He was possibly tasked with helping enforce tax collection and later oversaw the army registers of Iraq under the Umayyad governor, al-Hajjaj ibn Yusuf (r. 694–714). After his death in a campaign against the forces of the anti-Umayyad caliph Abd Allah ibn al-Zubayr, his son Abd al-Rahman succeeded him.

During the Second Muslim Civil War (680–692), the people of Medina rebelled against Caliph Yazid, and the latter dispatched an expeditionary force from Syria to suppress the Medinese. Yazid ibn Hurmuz was entrusted by the Medinese to lead the mawali of the city in defense of part of the defensive trench against the Syrians at the Battle of al-Harra in 683. The latter assaulted this part of the trench and called on Yazid ibn Hurmuz to surrender, but his forces held the Syrians off. In contrast, another unit of the Medinese, from the local Banu Haritha family, opened their quarter to the Syrians, allowing them to attack the Medinese defenders from the rear and rout them.

Yazid ibn Hurmuz was cited by early Islamic historians as a transmitter of reports. He died during the reign of the Umayyad caliph Umar II (r. 717–720). His son Abu Bakr Abd Allah al-Asamm (d. 765) was a faqih and transmitter of hadiths in Medina who a key supporter of the anti-Abbasid rebel Muhammad al-Nafs al-Zakiyya.

== Sources ==
- Kister, M. J. (1977). "The Battle of the Ḥarra: Some Socio-Economic Aspects". In Myriam Rosen Ayalon (ed.). Studies in Memory of Gaston Wiet. Jerusalem: Institute of Asian and African Studies. pp. 33–49.
- McAuliffe, Jane Dammen, ed. (1995). The History of al-Ṭabarī, Volume XXVIII: The ʿAbbāsid Authority Affirmed: The Early Years of al-Mansūr, A.D. 753–763/A.H. 136–145. SUNY Series in Near Eastern Studies. Albany, New York: State University of New York Press. ISBN 978-0-7914-1895-6.
- Rosenthal, Franz, ed. (1989). The History of al-Ṭabarī, Volume I: General Introduction and from the Creation to the Flood. SUNY Series in Near Eastern Studies. Albany, New York: State University of New York Press. ISBN 978-0-88706-562-0.
- Zakeri, Mohsen (1995). Sāsānid Soldiers in Early Muslim Society: The Origins of ʿAyyārān and Futuwwa. Wiesbaden: Otto Harrassowitz. ISBN 978-3-447-03652-8.
