= Hanzala Ibn Abi Amir =

Companion of Islamic prophet Muhammad (died 625)

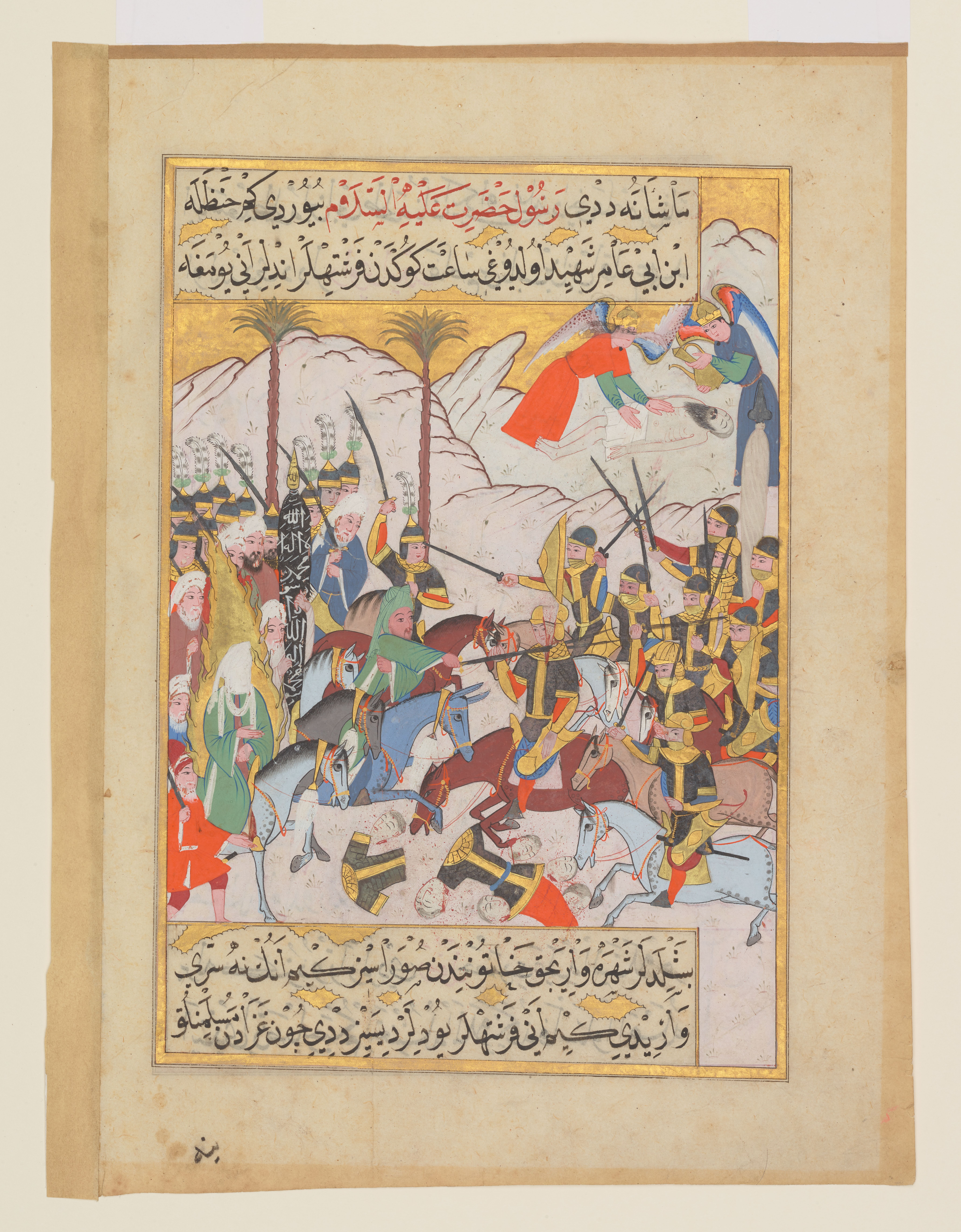
Angels washing Hanẓala's body, fallen in the Battle of Uhud (625), from "The Life of the Prophet" (Siyer-i Nebi). Created by Mustafa Darir, Constantinople (modern-day Istanbul), dated 1594-1595

Hanzala Ibn Abi Amir (Arabic: ﺣﻨﻈﻠـة ﺍﺑﻦ ﺍﺑﻲ ﻋﺎﻣﺮ) (c. 601 – 625) was one of the companions of the Islamic prophet Muhammad. He belonged to the Banu Aus tribe of the Ansar. His father, Abu Aamir was said to be a Christian. Hanzala was just 24 years old when he died in the Battle of Uhud while fighting against the polytheists. Hanzala, being a foot soldier, attacked Abu Sufyan ibn Harb's horse. However, Abu Sufyan ibn Harb was saved by Shaddād bin al-Aswad (also known as Ibn Sha'ub) who then killed Hanzala.

Hanzala had left for the battlefield to respond to the call of Jihad leaving his wife Jamila, daughter of Abd-Allah ibn Ubayy, on their wedding night. He did not have time to carry out Ghusl (ablution). Muhammad is said to have seen angels giving Hanzala a bath in between heaven and earth with fresh rainwater kept in silver vessels. Because of this honour, Hanzala earned the title of Ghaseel al-Malāʾika (Arabic: غسيل الملائكة) or the one cleansed by the angels. His son, Abd Allah ibn Hanzala, would command the people of Medina in opposition to the Umayyad Caliph Yazid I.
