= Abd Allah ibn Hanzala =

Medina Ansar faction leader (625/26–683)

- عبد الله بن حنظلة

Personal life
- Born: ʿAbd Allāh ibn Ḥanẓala ibn Abī ʿĀmir al-Anṣārī; 625/26 Medina
- Died: August 683
- Parents: Hanzala ibn Abi ‘Amir (father); Jamila bint Abd-Allah ibn Ubayy (mother)

Religious life
- Religion: Islam

Military service
- Allegiance: Rashidun Caliphate

ʿAbd Allāh ibn Ḥanẓala ibn Abī ʿĀmir al-Anṣārī (625/26 – August 683) was a companion of the Islamic Prophet Muhammad. He was the leader of the Ansar faction of Medina during the city’s revolt against the Umayyad caliph Yazid I in 682–683. He was killed when he led his forces to confront Yazid’s expeditionary army at the Battle of al-Harrah in August 683.

== Life ==
Abd Allah was the son of Hanzala ibn Abi ‘Amir, a sahaba (companion) of the Islamic prophet Muhammad who had been slain at the Battle of Uhud in 625. Abd Allah was born after his father's death. According to historian Julius Wellhausen, he was "celebrated from his birth as the posthumous son of the martyr of Uhud who was washed by the angels". Hence, he became known as "Ibn al-Ghasīl" after his father’s nickname "al-Ghasīl al-Malāʾika" (the one washed by the angels). He was the nephew of Abd-Allah ibn Abd-Allah ibn Ubayy.

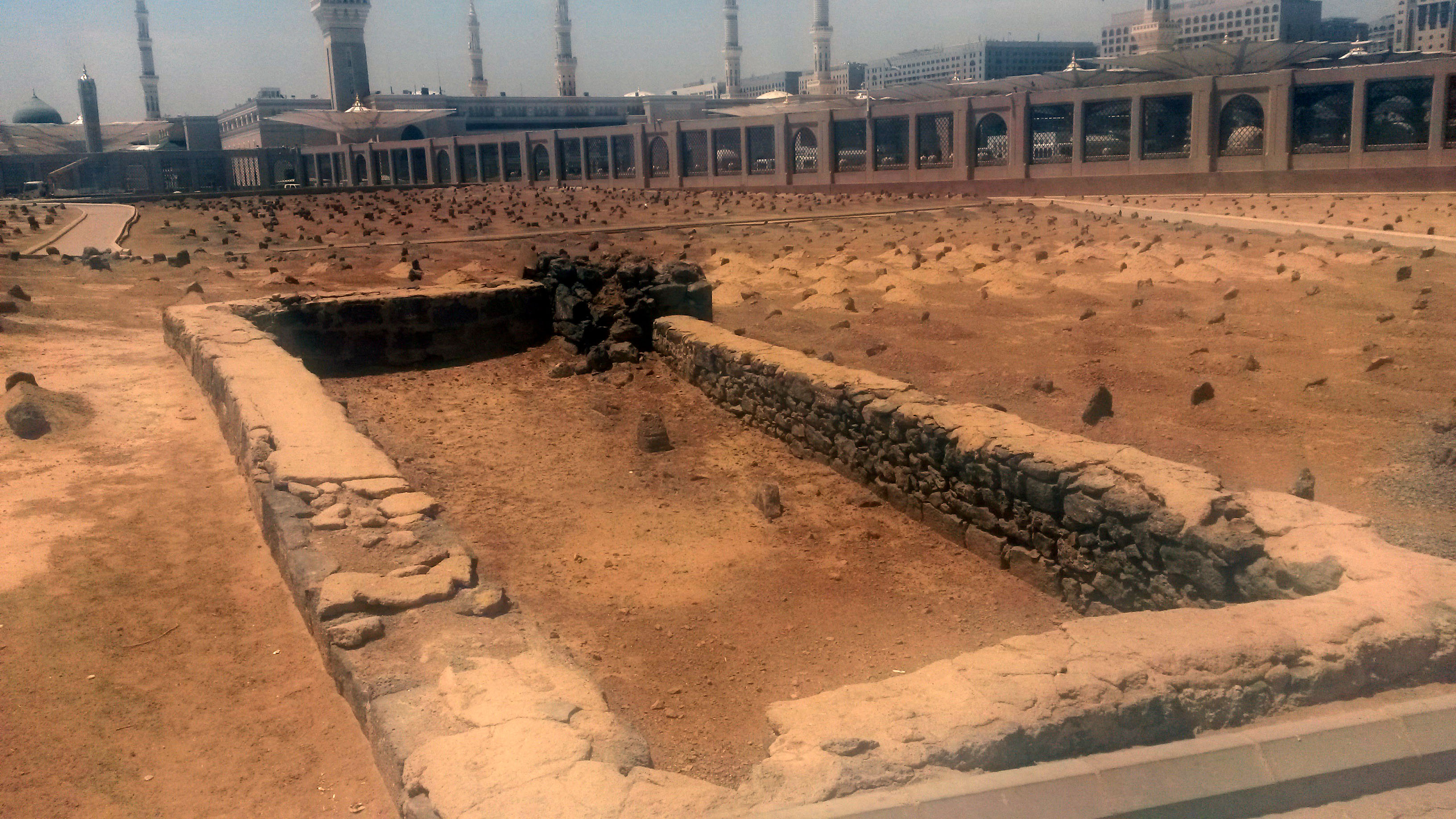
Baqi Grave for al-Harrah

When Yazid I succeeded his father Muawiya I as caliph, the move was opposed by the Ansar. The Ansar were the early supporters of Muhammad from Medina and this group had included Abd Allah's father. Abd Allah was part of a delegation from Medina sent by the Umayyad governor of the city, Uthman ibn Muhammad ibn Abi Sufyan, with the aim of reconciling with Yazid in the Umayyad capital, Damascus. Despite the warm reception, the delegation left Damascus with the conviction that Yazid was unfit to be caliph. Abd Allah was the most vocal in his criticism and was chosen by the Ansar to be their leader. Meanwhile, the Quraysh of Medina, who also opposed Yazid, chose Abd Allah ibn Muti as the leader of their faction.

Together, the Ansar and Quraysh drove out the Umayyads from Medina, prompting Yazid to dispatch an army led by Muslim ibn Uqba to bring the city into submission. The army, composed of the Arab tribesmen of Syria, took up strategic positions in the Harrah just east of Medina where they were met by the Ansar led by Abd Allah. During the ensuing battle, the Ansar of Medina were defeated and Abd Allah was slain. According to historians Ch. Pellat and K. V. Zettersteen, Abd Allah fought with "remarkable bravery ... but finally fell under the blows of the Syrians". Eight of his sons were also slain. His body was subsequently decapitated and his head was given to Ibn Uqba. The two soldiers credited with his death were rewarded by Yazid.

== Bibliography ==
- Wellhausen, Julius (1927). The Arab Kingdom and Its Fall. Translated by Margaret Graham Weir. Calcutta: University of Calcutta.
- Zettersteen, K. V. & Pellat, Ch. (1960). "Abd Allāh ibn Ḥanẓala". In Gibb, H. A. R.; Kramers, J. H.; Lévi-Provençal, E.; Schacht, J.; Lewis, B. & Pellat, Ch. (eds.). The Encyclopaedia of Islam, Second Edition. Volume I: A–B. Leiden: E. J. Brill. p. 45. OCLC 495469456.
