= Fatima and the Daughters of Muhammad =

Book by Henri Lammens

Fatima and the Daughters of Muhammad (French Fatima et les Filles de Mahomet) is a book written by Henri Lammens (Rome and Paris: Scripta Pontificii Instituti Biblici, 1912), in which he claims that Muhammad had not intended his succession to go through children of Fatima and she was not Muhammad's favourite daughter. He also claims that Muhammad's household, the Ahl al-Bayt, consisted exclusively of his wives, to the exclusion of his blood relations. Louis Massignon criticized Lammens for 'misinforming' his readers with his 'far too cynical and disparaging study' of Fatima.

According to Ibn Warraq, the book substantiates that all data concerning material favourable to Fatima, Ali and their children is subject to a searching criticism, however Lammens collected all material pertaining to anti-Ali and Fatima without considering whether something is right or wrong. He points out that a biography of the Prophet compiled by Lammens was never published by express orders from Rome, as its publication might have embarrassed the Holy See.
