= Husayn ibn Numayr al-Sakuni =

Umayyad Caliphate general (died 686)

Governor of Jund Hims
- In office 680–683
- Monarch: Yazid I
- Succeeded by: Nu'man ibn Bashir

Personal details
- Died: 5/6 August 686
- Relations: Mu'awiya ibn Yazid (grandson)
- Children: Yazid ibn Husayn
- Parent: Numayr

Military service
- Allegiance: Mu'awiya I (657–c. 661); Umayyad Caliphate (661–death)
- Battles/wars: First Fitna; Battle of Siffin; Arab–Byzantine wars; Second Fitna; Battle of al-Harra; Siege of Mecca; Battle of Ayn al-Warda; Battle of Khazir †

Al-Ḥuṣayn ibn Numayr al-Sakūnī (died 5/6 August 686) was a leading general of the early Umayyad Caliphate, from the Sakun subtribe of the Kinda.

== Biography ==
A man of his name is recorded as being responsible for the pacification of Hadhramaut during the Ridda Wars in 632, but most scholars reject that he is the same person as the Umayyad general. Husayn is first securely attested at the Battle of Siffin in 657, where he fought for the Umayyad governor of Syria, Mu'awiya ibn Abi Sufyan. After Mu'awiya became caliph, Husayn is mentioned as the leader of summer raids into Byzantine Asia Minor in 678 and 681/682.

Under Yazid I (r. 680–683) he became governor of the Jund Hims (military district of Homs), and in this capacity served in the Syrian army sent against the rebellion in Medina and Mecca in 683, under the command of Muslim ibn Uqba. After Muslim's death, he succeeded him in command of the campaign and laid siege to Ibn al-Zubayr in Mecca for two months. It was during this siege that the Kaaba burned down. Husayn maintained the siege for two months, until news reached him of Yazid's death. He then offered to recognize Ibn al-Zubayr as Caliph, provided that he would come to Syria, but when the latter refused, Husayn turned his army back.

The Kharijite Najdat faction and Najda bin Amir al-Hanafi excommunicated Husayn bin Numayr, fighting against his forces in the Battle of Jabal al-Haruriyya. In this battle, 8000 Syrian troops were killed, while Husayn bin Numayr managed to escape. Back in Syria, he played an important role in securing the election of the Umayyad elder, Marwan ibn al-Hakam, as caliph, instead of Yazid's young son Khalid. The leading Umayyad general, Ubayd Allah ibn Ziyad, then sent him to the Jazira, where, on 6 January 685, he defeated the Shi'a Tawwabin movement at the Battle of Ayn al-Warda. Husayn also participated in the attempted reconquest of Iraq under Ibn Ziyad, and like him, fell at the Battle of Khazir on 5 or 6 August 686.

His son, Yazid ibn Husayn, also fought for the Umayyads in the Second Fitna and served as the governor of Jund Hims for Umar II (r. 717–720), while his grandson Mu'awiya also served as governor of Hims for Yazid III (r. 743–744), but went over to Marwan II (r. 744–750) during the Third Fitna.

== Sources ==
- Crone, Patricia (1980). Slaves on Horses: The Evolution of the Islamic Polity (1980 ed.). Cambridge: Cambridge University Press. ISBN 978-0521229616.
- Lammens, H. & Cremonesi, V. (1971). "Al-Ḥuṣayn ibn Numayr". In Lewis, B.; Ménage, V. L.; Pellat, Ch. & Schacht, J. (eds.). The Encyclopaedia of Islam, Second Edition. Volume III: H–Iram. Leiden: E. J. Brill. pp. 620–621. OCLC 495469525.
