= Yahya ibn Jarir =

Abū Naṣr Yaḥyā ibn Jarīr al-Takrītī (fl. 1058–1103) was a Syriac Orthodox physician and scholar who wrote theology and history in Arabic.

Yaḥyā was probably born around 1030. He was a native of Tikrīt and a physician by occupation. He visited Constantinople in 1058. In 1070, he was the scribe of a manuscript, now Tehran, Malek National Museum and Library, MS 5925. He notes in the colophon that he completed the work in Mayyāfāriqīn. He was probably working for the emir of Diyār Bakr, Nizām al-Dīn (r. 1061–1079). He appears to have spent the rest of his life there. According to Ibn al-Azraq al-Fāriqī, who calls him "al-shaykh ... al-ṭabīb" ('the lord ... doctor'), he died in Mayyāfāriqīn in AH 497 (1103–1104).

Yaḥyā's major work is the Kitāb al-murshid (Book of the Guide), a theological compendium. It is divided into 54 chapters, beginning with issues of doctrine and progressing through sacramental and ecclesiastical issues. In chapter 22, he defends the reality and necessity of the crucifixion of Jesus against the Qurʾānic denial without alluding to Islam by expressly setting out to rebut the claims of Mani. The Kitāb al-murshid display deep learning and was widely read.

In the Kitāb al-murshid, Yaḥyā cites two of his other works, Zīj al-tawārīkh, a chronicle from creation to his own time, and Kitāb al-fāʾiq, which is probably the work On the Priest and Priesthood cited by al-Muʾtaman ibn al-ʿAssāl and Ibn Kabar. In addition, Ibn Abī Uṣaybiʿa cites works on sexual health and astrology.

Yaḥyā's manuscript, Malek 5925, contains Isḥāq ibn Ḥunayn's Arabic translation of Theophrastus's On First Principles and al-Fārābī's Mabādiʾ ārāʾ ahl al-madīna al-fāḍila (Principles of the Views of the Citizens of the Best State), of which it is the oldest copy. It has many marginal notes by Yaḥyā in both Arabic and Syriac, including citations of Gregory of Nyssa and Gregory Nazianzen.

== Bibliography ==
- Swanson, Mark N. (2015). "Mani as a Stand-In for Muslims?: The Question of Address in Yaḥyā ibn Jarīr, 'On the Necessity of the Crucifixion'". In Sidney H. Griffith; Sven Grebenstein (eds.). Christsein in der islamischen Welt: Festschrift für Martin Tamcke zum 60. Geburtstag. Harrassowitz Verlag. pp. 283–298. doi:10.2307/j.ctvc77120.19.
- Tannous, Jack B. (2018). The Making of the Medieval Middle East: Religion, Society, and Simple Believers. Princeton University Press.
- Teule, Herman G. B.; Swanson, Mark N. (2011). "Yaḥyā ibn Jarīr". In David Thomas; Alex Mallett; Juan Pedro Monferrer Sala; Johannes Pahlitzsch; Mark Swanson; Herman Teule; John Tolan (eds.). Christian–Muslim Relations: A Bibliographical History. Vol. 3 (1050–1200). Brill. pp. 280–286.
- Walzer, Richard, ed. (1985). Al-Farabi on the Perfect State: Abū Naṣr al-Fārābī's Mabādiʾ ārāʾ ahl al-madīna al-fāḍila. Clarendon Press.
