= Wahb ibn Jarir =

Muslim traditionist (died 822)

Wahb ibn Jarīr ibn Ḥazīm (Arabic: وهب بن جرير بن حازم) (died 822) was a Muslim traditionist from Basra and a source frequently cited in the histories of al-Tabari and Khalifa ibn Khayyat.

== Biography ==
Wahb was the son of Jarir ibn Hazim ibn Zayd (d. 786), who authored a work about the Azariqa, a 7th-century Kharijite movement active in Iraq and Persia. Wahb's family resided in Basra, and hailed from the Atik clan of the Azd, a large Arab tribe.

Through his transmission of earlier authors, Wahb was an important historical source for the Battle of the Camel, Kharijite revolts and the conflict between the Umayyad Caliphate and the inhabitants of the Hejaz (western Arabia). Wahb was regarded as a sahib Sunna by Ahmad ibn Hanbal, implying that he sympathized with Sunni Muslim doctrine. He was viewed as a reliable authority by his contemporaries Ibn Sa'd (d. 784), Yahya ibn Ma'in (d. 847) and al-Ijli. A major source for his information was his father and Juwayriya ibn Asma. He also was a major transmitter of the biography of the Islamic prophet Muhammad by Ibn Ishaq. Wahb is frequently cited in the historical work of Khalifa ibn Khayyat.
