= Henri Lammens =

Belgian orientalist historian and Jesuit (1862–1937)

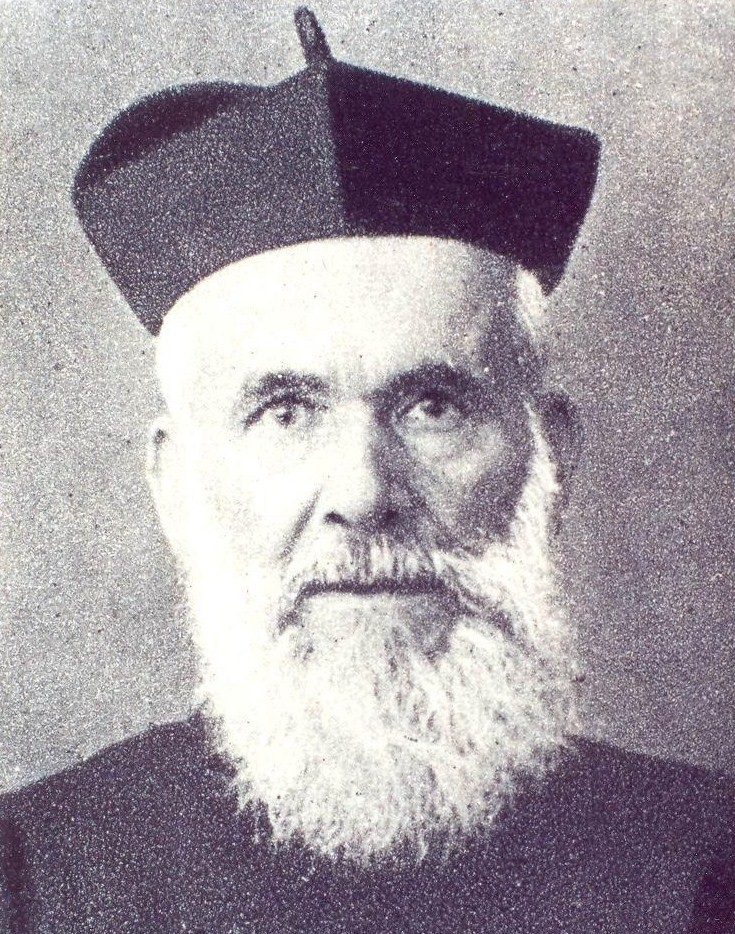
Henri Lammens

Henri Lammens (1 July 1862 – 23 April 1937) was a Belgian Orientalist historian and Jesuit, who wrote (in French) on the early history of Islam.

== Education and career as a Jesuit ==
Born in Ghent, Belgium of Catholic Flemish stock, Henri Lammens joined the Society of Jesus in Beirut at the age of fifteen, and settled permanently in Lebanon. During his first eight years in Lebanon, Lammens mastered Arabic as well as Latin and Greek, and he studied philosophy at the Jesuit-run Saint Joseph University in Beirut. Between 1886 and 1891 he taught the Arabic language at the same university. His early published writings are on the subject of Arabic language. Starting in 1903 he taught Islamic history at the Oriental Studies Department at Saint Joseph University in Beirut. In 1907 he went to the Jesuit-run universities at Cairo and Alexandria in Egypt to do the same, and returned to Beirut in 1919. He also lived in Rome for a while.

== Other writings ==
Lammens was the editor Al-Bashir, a Catholic journal published in Beirut. He was also a frequent contributor to the popular Beirut-based scholarly journal, Al-Machriq. In a review of the 1890 historical geography textbook by Maronite priest and scholar Fadl Allah Abu Halqa, Lammens criticised Abu Halqa for his ignorance of the classical languages, including Greek, Hebrew and Syriac.

Henry Lammens published one of the earliest in-depth pieces on Zionism in Arabic in 1899 in the journal al-Machriq, titled The Jews in Palestine and their Settlements. He surveyed the existing Zionist settlements, dividing them into five categories: Jaffa and its surroundings; Jerusalem and its Surroundings; Safed and Bilad al-Bishara (i.e. the Galilee); Haifa and its surroundings, and the Hawran and Transjordan ('Abr al-Urdunn). His tone was dry and detached, seemingly indifferent to the whole matter. He made no mention anywhere that the Jews were interested in establishing an independent government in Palestine. His only point of criticism was that the Jews had violated orders of the Sultan in establishing their colonies. His only source was a report published in the Istanbul-based, Journal of the Palestine Association.

== Works ==
(List incomplete)

- Islam: Beliefs and Institutions.
- Quran and Tradition (1910)
- The Age of Muhammad and the Chronology of the Sira
- Fatima and the Daughters of Muhammad (1912)
