= Yazid I =

Umayyad caliph from 680 to 683

Yazid I; يزيد بن معاوية
- Amir al-Mu'minin; Khalifat Allah
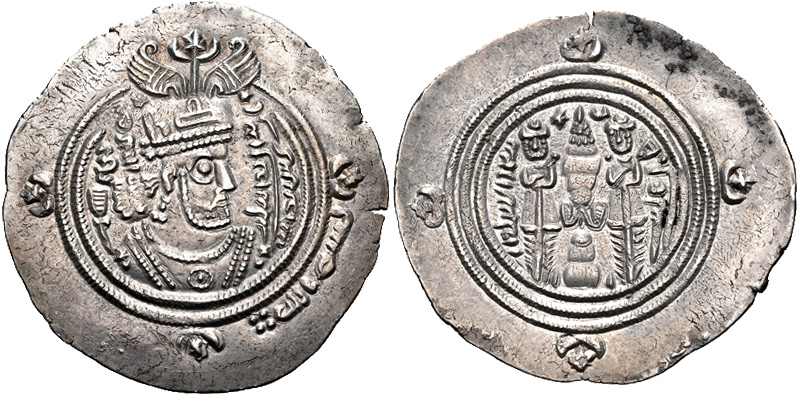
- Arab-Sasanian dirham of Yazid I, struck at the Basra mint, dated AH 61 (680/1 CE), the year in which the Battle of Karbala occurred. The obverse side shows the portrait of the Sasanian shah Khosrow II (r. 590–628) and his name in the Pahlavi script.

2nd Caliph of the Umayyad Caliphate
- Reign: April 680 (Note: Mu'awiya died in the month of Rajab 60 AH. Rajab of the year 60 AH started on 7 April 680. The precise date of death varies depending on the source: 7 April according to Ibn al-Kalbi (d. 819), 21 April according to al-Waqidi (d. 823), and 29 April according to al-Mada'ini (d. 843). Yazid acceded to the caliphate a few days after Mu'awiya's death; according to Abu Mikhnaf (d. 774), his accession was on 7 April, whereas Elijah of Nisibis placed it on 21 April.) – 11 November 683
- Predecessor: Mu'awiya I
- Successor: Mu'awiya II
- Born: c. 646 (25 AH) (Note: His year of birth is uncertain. His age at the time of his death is reported to have been between 35 and 43 lunar years. The earliest report of his birth is 22 AH, which corresponds to 642–643, and comes closest to the age of 43 years. The historians Henri Lammens and Michael Jan de Goeje both prefer this date. Another report puts his birth in 25 AH, which corresponds to 645–646. The age of 35 years would put his birth year at 29 AH, corresponding to 649.); Syria, Rashidun Caliphate
- Died: 11 November 683 (aged c. 37) (14 Rabi al-Awwal 64 AH); Huwwarin, Syria
- Spouse: Fakhitah bint Abi Hisham; Umm Kulthum bint Abd Allah
- Issue: Mu'awiya II; Khalid; Abd Allah; Atika
- House: Sufyanid
- Dynasty: Umayyad
- Father: Mu'awiya I
- Mother: Maysun bint Bahdal
- Religion: Islam

Yazid ibn Mu'awiya ibn Abi Sufyan (Note: Arabic: يزيد بن معاوية بن أبي سفيان, romanized: Yazīd ibn Muʿāwiya ibn ʾAbī Sufyān) (c. 646 – 11 November 683), commonly known as Yazid I, was the second caliph of the Umayyad Caliphate, ruling from April 680 until his death in November 683. His appointment by his father Mu'awiya I (r. 661–680) was the first hereditary succession to the caliphate in Islamic history. His caliphate was marked by the death of Muhammad's grandson Husayn ibn Ali and the start of the crisis known as the Second Fitna.

During his father's caliphate, Yazid led several campaigns against the Byzantine Empire including an attack on the Byzantine capital, Constantinople. Yazid's nomination as heir apparent in 676 CE (56 AH) by Mu'awiya was opposed by several Muslim grandees from the Hejaz region, including Husayn and Abd Allah ibn al-Zubayr. The two men refused to recognize Yazid following his accession and took sanctuary in Mecca. When Husayn left for Kufa in Iraq to lead a revolt against Yazid, he was killed with his small band of supporters by Yazid's forces in the Battle of Karbala. Husayn's death caused resentment in the Hejaz, where Ibn al-Zubayr called for a consultative assembly to elect a new caliph. The people of Medina, who supported Ibn al-Zubayr, held other grievances toward the Umayyads. After failing to gain the allegiance of Ibn al-Zubayr and the people of the Hejaz through diplomacy, Yazid sent an army to suppress their rebellion. The army defeated the Medinans in the Battle of al-Harra in August 683 and the city was plundered. Afterward, Mecca was besieged for several weeks until the army withdrew as a result of Yazid's death in November 683. The Caliphate fell into a nearly decade-long civil war, ending with the establishment of the Marwanid dynasty (the Umayyad caliph Marwan I and his descendants).

Yazid continued Mu'awiya's decentralized model of governance, relying on his provincial governors and the tribal nobility. He abandoned Mu'awiya's ambitious raids against the Byzantine Empire and strengthened Syria's military defenses. No new territories were conquered during his reign. Yazid is considered an illegitimate ruler and a tyrant by many Muslims due to his hereditary succession, the death of Husayn, and the campaign on Mecca and Medina he ordered. Modern historians take a milder view, and consider him a capable ruler, albeit less successful than his father.

== Early life ==
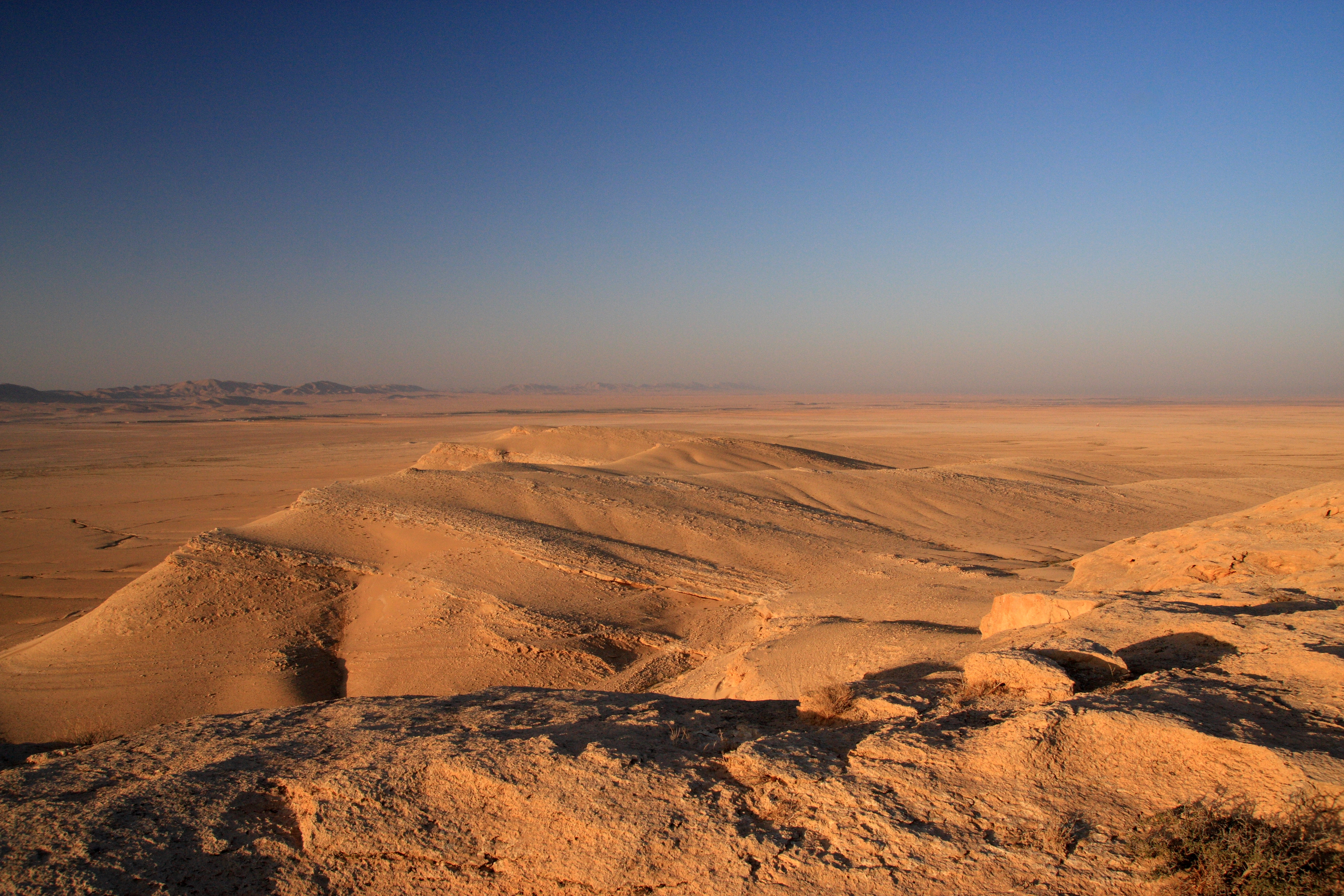
The Syrian Desert, where Yazid spent his childhood springs with his maternal Bedouin kin from the Banu Kalb tribe

Yazid was born in Syria. His year of birth is uncertain, placed between 642 and 649. His father was Mu'awiya ibn Abi Sufyan, then governor of Syria under Caliph Uthman (r. 644–656). Mu'awiya and Uthman belonged to the wealthy Umayyad clan of the Quraysh tribe, a grouping of Meccan clans to which the Islamic prophet Muhammad and all the preceding caliphs belonged. Yazid's mother, Maysun, was the daughter of Bahdal ibn Unayf, a chieftain of the powerful Bedouin tribe of Banu Kalb. She was a Christian, like most of her tribe. Yazid grew up with his maternal Kalbite kin, spending the springs of his youth in the Syrian Desert; for the remainder of the year he was in the company of the Greek and native Syrian courtiers of his father, who became caliph in 661.

During his father's caliphate, Yazid led several campaigns against the Byzantine Empire, which the Caliphate had been trying to conquer, including an attack on the Byzantine capital, Constantinople. Sources give several dates for this between 49 AH (669–70 CE) and 55 AH (674–75 CE). Muslim sources offer few details of his role in the campaigns, possibly downplaying his involvement due to the controversies of his later career. He is portrayed in these sources as having been unwilling to participate in the expedition to the chagrin of Mu'awiya, who then forced him to comply. However, two eighth-century non-Muslim sources from al-Andalus (Islamic Spain), the Chronicle of 741 and the Chronicle of 754, both of which likely drew their material from an earlier Arabic work, report that Yazid besieged Constantinople with a 100,000-strong army. Unable to conquer the city, the army captured adjacent towns, acquired considerable loot, and retreated after two years. Yazid also led the hajj (the annual Muslim pilgrimage to Mecca) on several occasions.

== Ascension ==
The third caliph Uthman drew the ire of the Muslim settlers of the conquered lands as a consequence of his controversial policies, which were seen by many as nepotistic and interfering in provincial affairs. In 656 he was killed by the provincial rebels in Medina, then capital of the Caliphate, after which Ali, the cousin and son-in-law of Muhammad, was recognized as caliph by the rebels and the inhabitants of Medina. In the consequent first Islamic civil war (656–661), Mu'awiya opposed Ali from his stronghold in Syria, fighting him to a stalemate at the Battle of Siffin in 657. In January 661 Ali was assassinated by a Kharijite (a faction opposed to Ali and Mu'awiya), after which his son Hasan was recognized as his successor. In August, Mu'awiya, who had already been recognized as caliph by his partisans in Syria, led his army toward Kufa, the capital of Hasan and Ali in Iraq, and gained control over the rest of the Caliphate by securing a peace treaty with Hasan. The terms of the treaty stipulated that Mu'awiya would not nominate a successor. Although the treaty brought a temporary peace, no framework of succession was established.

Mu'awiya was determined to install Yazid as his successor. The idea was scandalous to Muslims, as hereditary succession had no precedent in Islamic history—earlier caliphs had been elected either by popular support in Medina or by the consultation of the senior companions of Muhammad—and according to Islamic principles, the position of ruler was not the private property of a ruler to award to his descendants. It was also unacceptable by Arab custom, according to which the rulership should not pass from father to son but within the wider clan. According to the orientalist Bernard Lewis, the "only precedents available to Mu'āwiya from Islamic history were election and civil war. The former was unworkable; the latter had obvious drawbacks." Mu'awiya passed over his eldest son Abd Allah, who was from his Qurayshite wife, perhaps due to the stronger support Yazid had in Syria because of his Kalbite parentage. The Banu Kalb was dominant in southern Syria and led the larger tribal confederation of Quda'a. The Quda'a were established in Syria long before Islam and had acquired significant military experience and familiarity with hierarchical order under the Byzantines, as opposed to the more free-spirited tribesmen of Arabia and Iraq. Northern Syria, on the other hand, was dominated by the tribal confederation of Qays, which had immigrated there during Mu'awiya's reign, and resented the privileged position of the Kalb in the Umayyad court. By appointing Yazid to lead campaigns against the Byzantines, Mu'awiya may have sought to foster support for Yazid from the northern tribesmen. The policy had limited success as the Qays opposed the nomination of Yazid, at least in the beginning, for he was "the son of a Kalbi woman". In the Hejaz (western Arabia, where Medina and Mecca are located and where the old Muslim elite resided), Yazid had support among his Umayyad kinsmen, but there were other members of the Hejazi nobility whose approval was important. By appointing Yazid to lead the hajj rituals there, Mu'awiya may have hoped to enlist support for Yazid's succession and elevate his status as a Muslim leader. According to Abu al-Faraj al-Isfahani (d. 967), Mu'awiya had also employed poets to influence public opinion in favour of Yazid's succession.

According to the account of Ibn Athir (d. 1233), Mu'awiya summoned a shura (consultative assembly) of influential men from all of the provinces to his capital, Damascus, in 676 and won their support through flattery, bribes, and threats. He then ordered his Umayyad kinsman Marwan ibn al-Hakam, the governor of Medina, to inform its people of his decision. Marwan faced resistance, especially from Ali's son and Muhammad's grandson Husayn, and Abd Allah ibn al-Zubayr, Abd Allah ibn Umar, and Abd al-Rahman ibn Abi Bakr, all sons of prominent companions of Muhammad, who, by virtue of their descent, could also lay claim to the caliphal office. Mu'awiya went to Medina and pressed the four dissenters to accede, but they fled to Mecca. He followed and threatened some of them with death, but to no avail. Nonetheless, he was successful in convincing the people of Mecca that the four had pledged their allegiance, and received the Meccans' allegiance for Yazid. On his way back to Damascus, he secured allegiance from the people of Medina. General recognition of the nomination thus forced Yazid's opponents into silence. The orientalist Julius Wellhausen doubted the story, holding that the reports of the nomination's rejection by prominent Medinese were a back-projection of the events that followed Mu'awiya's death. A similar opinion is held by the historian Andrew Marsham. According to the account of al-Tabari (d. 923), Mu'awiya announced the nomination in 676 and only received delegations from the Iraqi garrison town of Basra, which pledged allegiance to Yazid in Damascus in 679 or 680. According to al-Ya'qubi (d. 898), Mu'awiya demanded allegiance for Yazid on the occasion of the Hajj. All, except the four prominent Muslims mentioned above, complied. No force was used against them. In any case, Mu'awiya arranged a general recognition for Yazid's succession before his death.

== Reign ==
Mu'awiya died in April 680. According to al-Tabari, Yazid was at his residence in Huwwarin, located between Damascus and Palmyra, at the time of his father's death. According to verses of Yazid preserved in Isfahani's Kitab al-Aghani, a collection of Arabic poetry, Yazid was away on a summertime expedition against the Byzantines when he received the news of Mu'awiya's final illness. Based on this and the fact that Yazid arrived in Damascus only after Mu'awiya's death, the historian Henri Lammens has rejected the reports of Yazid being in Huwwarin. Mu'awiya entrusted supervision of the government to his most loyal associates, Al-Dahhak ibn Qays al-Fihri and Muslim ibn Uqba al-Murri, until Yazid's return. He left a will for Yazid, instructing him on matters of governing the Caliphate. He was advised to beware Husayn and Ibn al-Zubayr, for they could challenge his rule, and instructed to defeat them if they did. Yazid was further advised to treat Husayn with caution and not to spill his blood, since he was the grandson of Muhammad. Ibn al-Zubayr, on the other hand, was to be treated harshly, unless he came to terms.

=== Oaths of allegiance ===
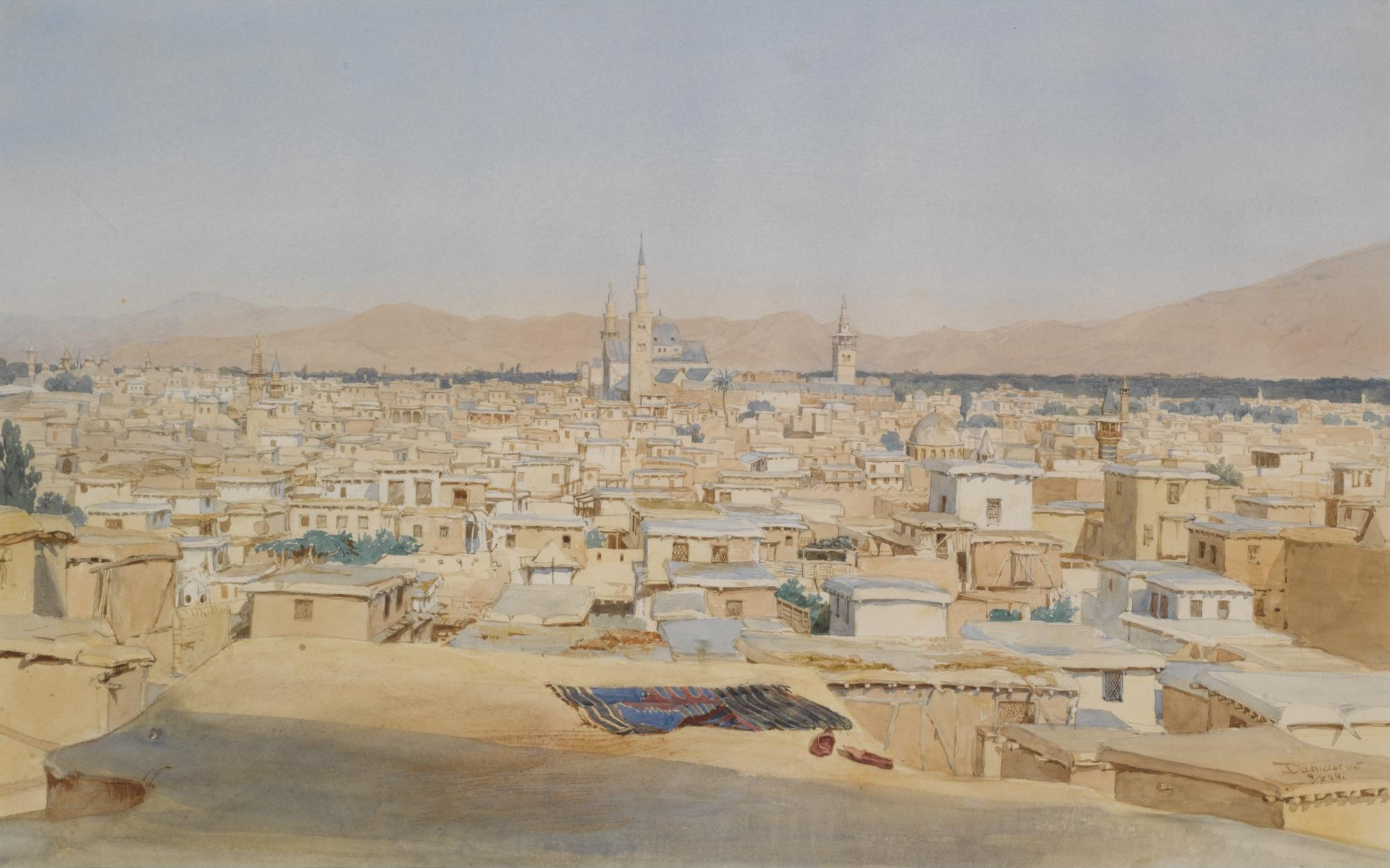
An early 19th-century painting of Damascus, Yazid's capital

Upon his accession, Yazid requested and received oaths of allegiance from the governors of the provinces. He wrote to the governor of Medina, his cousin Al-Walid ibn Utba ibn Abi Sufyan, informing him of Mu'awiya's death and instructing him to secure allegiance from Husayn, Ibn al-Zubayr, and Ibn Umar. The instructions contained in the letter were:

Seize Husayn, Abdullah ibn Umar, and Abdullah ibn al-Zubayr to give the oath of allegiance. Act so fiercely that they have no chance to do anything before giving the oath of allegiance.

Al-Walid sought the advice of Marwan, who suggested that Ibn al-Zubayr and Husayn be forced to pay allegiance as they were dangerous, while Ibn Umar should be left alone as he posed no threat. Husayn answered Al-Walid's summon, meeting Al-Walid and Marwan in a semi-private meeting where he was informed of Mu'awiya's death and Yazid's accession. When asked for his oath of allegiance, Husayn responded that giving his allegiance in private would be insufficient and suggested the oath be made in public. Al-Walid agreed, but Marwan insisted that Husayn be detained until he proffered allegiance. Husayn scolded Marwan and left to join his armed retinue, who were waiting nearby in case the authorities attempted to apprehend him. Immediately following Husayn's exit, Marwan admonished Al-Walid, who in turn justified his refusal to harm Husayn by dint of the latter's close relation to Muhammad. Ibn al-Zubayr did not answer the summons and left for Mecca. Al-Walid sent eighty horsemen after him, but he escaped. Husayn too left for Mecca shortly after, without having sworn allegiance to Yazid. Dissatisfied with this failure, Yazid replaced Al-Walid with his distant Umayyad kinsman Amr ibn Sa'id ibn al-As. Unlike Husayn and Ibn al-Zubayr, Ibn Umar, Abd al-Rahman ibn Abi Bakr, and Abd Allah ibn Abbas, who had also previously denounced Mu'awiya's nomination of Yazid, (Note: The reports of Abd Allah ibn Abbas's earlier rejection of Yazid's nomination by Mu'awiya are doubted by modern historians who suspect the reports to have been Abbasid efforts to elevate the status of Ibn Abbas, the ancestor of the Abbasid dynasty, and equate him with other prominent leaders of the resistance.) paid allegiance to him.

=== Battle of Karbala ===
In Mecca Husayn received letters from pro-Alid (Note: Pro-Alids or Alid partisans were political supporters of Ali, and later of his descendants.) Kufans, inviting him to lead them in revolt against Yazid. Husayn subsequently sent his cousin Muslim ibn Aqil to assess the situation in the city. He also sent letters to Basra, but his messenger was handed over to the governor Ubayd Allah ibn Ziyad and killed. Ibn Aqil informed Husayn of the large-scale support he found in Kufa, signalling that the latter should enter the city. Informed by some Kufan tribal chiefs (ashraf) of the goings-on, Yazid replaced the governor of Kufa, Nu'man ibn Bashir, who had been unwilling to take action against pro-Alid activity, with Ibn Ziyad, whom he ordered to execute or imprison Ibn Aqil. As a result of Ibn Ziyad's suppression and political maneuvering, Ibn Aqil's following began to dissipate and he was forced to declare the revolt prematurely. It was suppressed and Ibn Aqil was executed.

Encouraged by Ibn Aqil's letter, Husayn left for Kufa, ignoring warnings from Ibn Umar and Ibn Abbas. The latter reminded him, to no avail, of the Kufans' previous abandonment of his father Ali and his brother Hasan. On the way to the city, he received news of Ibn Aqil's death. Nonetheless, he continued his march towards Kufa. Ibn Ziyad's 4,000-strong army blocked his entry into the city and forced him to camp in the desert of Karbala. Ibn Ziyad would not let Husayn pass without submitting, which Husayn refused to do. Week-long negotiations failed, and in the ensuing hostilities on 10 October 680, Husayn and 72 of his male companions were slain, while his family was taken prisoner. The captives and Husayn's severed head were sent to Yazid. According to the accounts of Abu Mikhnaf (d. 774) and Ammar al-Duhni (d. 750–751), Yazid poked Husayn's head with his staff, although others ascribe this action to Ibn Ziyad. (Note: According to Julius Wellhausen, the attribution to Yazid is likely correct as the staff of office was usually held by monarchs. According to Henri Lammens, the deed was likely performed by Ibn Ziyad but the Iraqi chroniclers, whose sympathies lay with Husayn, were only eager to transfer the scene to Damascus.) Yazid treated the captives well and sent them back to Medina after a few days according to some non-muslim sources.

=== Revolt of Abd Allah ibn al-Zubayr ===
Following Husayn's death, Yazid faced increased opposition to his rule from Ibn al-Zubayr who declared him deposed. Although publicly he called for a shura to elect a new caliph, in secret Ibn al-Zubayr let his partisans pay allegiance to him. At first, Yazid attempted to placate him by sending gifts and delegations in an attempt to reach a settlement. After Ibn al-Zubayr's refusal to recognize him, Yazid sent a force led by Ibn al-Zubayr's estranged brother Amr to arrest him. The force was defeated and Amr was taken captive and executed. As well as Ibn al-Zubayr's growing influence in Medina, the city's inhabitants were disillusioned with Umayyad rule and Mu'awiya's agricultural projects, which included the confiscation of their lands to boost government revenue. Yazid invited the notables of Medina to Damascus and tried to win them over with gifts. They were unpersuaded and on their return to Medina narrated tales of Yazid's lavish lifestyle. Accusations included Yazid drinking wine, hunting with hounds, and his love for music. The Medinans, under the leadership of Abd Allah ibn Hanzala, renounced their allegiance to Yazid and expelled the city governor, Yazid's cousin Uthman ibn Muhammad ibn Abi Sufyan, along with the rest of the Umayyads residing in the city. Yazid dispatched a 12,000-strong army under the command of Muslim ibn Uqba to reconquer the Hejaz. After failed negotiations, the Medinans were defeated in the Battle of al-Harra. According to the accounts of Abu Mikhnaf and al-Samhudi (d. 1533), the city was plundered, whereas per the account of Awana (d. 764) only the ringleaders of the rebellion were executed. Having forced the rebels to renew their allegiance, Yazid's army headed for Mecca to subdue Ibn al-Zubayr. Ibn Uqba died on the way to Mecca and command passed to Husayn ibn Numayr al-Sakuni, who besieged Mecca in September 683. The siege lasted for several weeks, during which the Ka'ba, the sacred Muslim shrine at the center of the Mecca Mosque, caught fire. (Note: Some later Muslim sources assert that the Syrians caused the fire. It is more likely that the defenders caused it accidentally.) Yazid's sudden death in November 683 ended the campaign and Ibn Numayr retreated to Syria with his army.

=== Domestic affairs and foreign campaigns ===
The style of Yazid's governance was, by and large, a continuation of the model developed by Mu'awiya. He continued to rely on the governors of the provinces and ashraf, as Mu'awiya had, instead of relatives. He retained several of Mu'awiya's officials, including Ibn Ziyad, who was Mu'awiya's governor of Basra, and Sarjun ibn Mansur, a native Syrian Christian, who had served as the head of the fiscal administration under Mu'awiya. Like Mu'awiya, Yazid received delegations of tribal notables (wufud) from the provinces to win their support, which would also involve distributing gifts and bribes. The structure of the caliphal administration and military remained decentralised as in Mu'awiya's time. Provinces retained much of their tax revenue and forwarded a small portion to the Caliph. The military units in the provinces were derived from local tribes whose command also fell to the ashraf.

In Syria, Yazid established the northern border district of Qinnasrin.

Yazid approved a decrease in taxes on the Christian community of Najran upon their request, but abolished the special tax exemption of the ethno-religious community of Samaritans, which had been granted to them by previous caliphs as a reward for their aid to the Muslim conquerors. He improved the irrigation system of the fertile lands of the Ghouta near Damascus by digging a canal that became known as Nahr Yazid.

Toward the end of his reign, Mu'awiya reached a thirty-year peace agreement with the Byzantines, obliging the Caliphate to pay an annual tribute of 3,000 gold coins, 50 horses, and 50 slaves, and to withdraw Muslim troops from the forward bases they had occupied on the island of Rhodes and the Anatolian coast. Under Yazid, Muslim bases along the Sea of Marmara were abandoned. In contrast to the far-reaching raids against the Byzantine Empire launched under his father, Yazid focused on stabilizing the border with Byzantium. In order to improve Syria's military defences and prevent Byzantine incursions, Yazid established the northern Syrian frontier district of Qinnasrin from what had been a part of Hims, and garrisoned it.

Yazid reappointed Uqba ibn Nafi, the conqueror of the central North African region of Ifriqiya whom Mu'awiya had deposed, as governor of Ifriqiya. In 681, Uqba launched a large-scale expedition into western North Africa. Defeating the Berbers and the Byzantines, Uqba reached the Atlantic coast and captured Tangier and Volubilis. He was unable to establish permanent control in these territories. On his return to Ifriqiya, he was ambushed and killed by a Berber–Byzantine force at the Battle of Vescera, resulting in the loss of the conquered territories. In 681 Yazid appointed Ibn Ziyad's brother Salm ibn Ziyad as the governor of the northeastern border province of Khurasan. Salm led several campaigns in Transoxiana (Central Asia) and raided Samarqand and Khwarazm, but without gaining a permanent foothold in any of them. Yazid's death in 683 and the subsequent chaos in the east ended the campaigns.

== Death and succession ==
Yazid died on 11 November 683 in the central Syrian desert town of Huwwarin, his favourite residence, aged between 35 and 43, and was buried there. Early annalists like Abu Ma'shar al-Madani (d. 778) and al-Waqidi (d. 823) do not give any details about his death. This lack of information seems to have inspired fabrication of accounts by authors with anti-Umayyad leanings, which detail several causes of death, including a horse fall, excessive drinking, pleurisy, and burning. According to the verses by a contemporary poet Ibn Arada, who at the time resided in Khurasan, Yazid died in his bed with a wine cup by his side.

Ibn al-Zubayr subsequently declared himself caliph and Iraq and Egypt came under his rule. In Syria, Yazid's son Mu'awiya II, whom he had nominated, became caliph. His control was limited to parts of Syria as most of the Syrian districts (Hims, Qinnasrin, and Palestine) were controlled by allies of Ibn al-Zubayr. Mu'awiya II died after a few months from an unknown illness. Several early sources state that he abdicated before his death. Following his death, Yazid's maternal Kalbite tribesmen, seeking to maintain their privileges, sought to install Yazid's son Khalid on the throne, but he was considered too young for the post by the non-Kalbites in the pro-Umayyad coalition. Consequently, Marwan ibn al-Hakam was acknowledged as caliph in a shura of pro-Umayyad tribes in June 684. Shortly after, Marwan and the Kalb routed the pro-Zubayrid forces in Syria led by al-Dahhak at the Battle of Marj Rahit. Although the pro-Umayyad shura stipulated that Khalid would succeed Marwan, the latter nominated his son Abd al-Malik as his heir. Thus the Sufyanid house, named after Mu'awiya I's father Abu Sufyan, was replaced by the Marwanid house of the Umayyad dynasty. By 692 Abd al-Malik had defeated Ibn al-Zubayr and restored Umayyad authority across the Caliphate.

== Legacy ==
The killing of Muhammad's grandson Husayn caused widespread outcry among Muslims and the image of Yazid suffered greatly. It also helped crystallize opposition to Yazid into an anti-Umayyad movement based on Alid aspirations, and contributed to the development of Shia identity, whereby the party of Alid partisans was transformed into a religious sect with distinct rituals and memory. After the Battle of Karbala, Shia imams from Husayn's line adopted the policy of political quietism.

=== Traditional Muslim view ===
Yazid is considered an evil figure by many Muslims to the present day, not only by the Shia, who hold that the ruling position rightly belonged to Husayn's father Ali and his descendants, including Husayn, whom Yazid killed to strip him of his right, but also by many Sunnis, to whom he was an affront to Islamic values. For the Shia, Yazid is an epitome of evil. He is annually reviled in the Ashura processions and passion plays, and rulers considered tyrannical and oppressive are often equated with him. Before the Iranian Revolution, the Shah of Iran was called the "Yazid of his time" by the Iranian cleric Rouhollah Khomeini, as was the Iraqi president Saddam Hussein by the Iraqi Shia during the Iran–Iraq War for his ban on pilgrimages to the holy sites of Shia Islam. Among the Sunnis, the Hanafi school allows cursing of Yazid, whereas the Hanbali school and many in the Shafi'i school maintain that no judgment should be passed on Yazid, rather tyrants in general should be cursed. However, the Hanbali scholar Ibn al-Jawzi (d. 1201) encouraged the cursing. (Note: He wrote a treatise on the subject titled Risala fi jawaz al-la'n ala Yazid (Treatise on the legality of cursing Yazid), and another refuting those who prohibited such practice: Al-radd ali al-muta'sib al-'anid al-mani fi dhamm Yazid (Reply to the stubborn fanatic who forbids condemnation of Yazid).) According to al-Ghazali (d. 1111), cursing Yazid is prohibited, for he was a Muslim and his role in the killing of Husayn is unverified.

Yazid was the first person in the history of the Caliphate to be nominated as heir based on a blood relationship, and this became a tradition afterwards. As such, his accession is considered by the Muslim historical tradition as the corruption of the caliphate into a kingship. He is depicted as a tyrant who was responsible for three major crimes during his caliphate: the death of Husayn and his followers at Karbala, considered a massacre; the aftermath of the Battle of al-Harra, in which Yazid's troops sacked Medina; and the burning of the Ka'ba during the siege of Mecca, which is blamed on Yazid's commander Husayn ibn Numayr. The tradition stresses his habits of drinking, dancing, hunting, and keeping pet animals such as dogs and monkeys, portraying him as impious and unworthy of leading the Muslim community. Extant contemporary Muslim histories describe Yazid as "a sinner in respect of his belly and his private parts", "an arrogant drunken sot", and "motivated by defiance of God, lack of faith in His religion and hostility toward His Messenger". Al-Baladhuri (d. 892) described him as the "commander of the sinners" (amir al-fasiqin), as opposed to the title commander of the faithful (amir al-mu'minin) usually applied to the caliphs. Nevertheless, some historians have argued that there is a tendency in early Muslim sources to exonerate Yazid of blame for Husayn's death, and put the blame squarely on Ibn Ziyad. According to the historian James Lindsay, the Syrian historian Ibn Asakir (d. 1176) attempted to stress Yazid's positive qualities, while accepting the allegations that are generally made against him. Ibn Asakir thus emphasised that Yazid was a transmitter of hadith (the sayings and traditions attributed to Muhammad), a virtuous man "by reason of his connection to the age of the Prophet", and worthy of the ruling position.

=== Modern scholarly view ===
Despite his reputation in religious circles and among the general Islamic historians of Yazid's era and after, Orientalist historians generally portray a more favourable view of Yazid. According to Wellhausen, Yazid was a mild ruler, who resorted to violence only when necessary, and was not the tyrant that the religious tradition portrays him to be. He further notes that Yazid lacked interest in public affairs as a prince, but as a caliph "he seems to have pulled himself together, although he did not give up his old predilections,—wine, music, the chase and other sport". In the view of the historian Hugh N. Kennedy, despite the disasters of Karbala and al-Harra, Yazid's rule was "not devoid of achievement". His reputation might have improved had he lived longer, but his early death played a part in sticking of the stigma of "the shocks of the early part of his reign". According to the Islamicist G. R. Hawting, Yazid tried to continue the diplomatic policies of his father but, unlike Mu'awiya, he was not successful in winning over the opposition with gifts and bribes. In Hawting's summation, "the image of Muʿāwiya as operating more like a tribal s̲h̲ayk̲h̲ than a traditional Middle Eastern despot ... also seems applicable to Yazīd". In the view of Lewis, Yazid was a capable ruler "with much of the ability of his father" but was overly criticized by later Arab historians. Expressing a viewpoint similar to Wellhausen's, Lammens remarked, "a poet himself, and fond of music, he was a Maecenas of poets and artists".

The characterization of Yazid in the Muslim sources has been attributed to the hostility of the Abbasid dynasty, during whose rule the histories were written, toward the Umayyads, whom they toppled in 750. Most reports in the traditional Muslim sources focus on the revolts against Yazid, and usually lack detail on his public life in Syria and his activities other than the suppression of the revolts. Lammens has attributed this to the tendency of the Iraq-based, Abbasid-era chroniclers to portray a caliph under whom Husayn was killed and the holy cities of Islam were attacked only as an impious drunkard. In contrast, a Syrian source preserved in the Chronicle of 741 describes the Caliph as "a most pleasant man and deemed highly agreeable by all the peoples subject to his rule. He never, as is the wont of men, sought glory for himself because of his royal rank, but lived as a citizen along with all the common people."

=== Yazidism ===
In the Yazidi religion, practiced by the mainly Iraq-based Kurdish-speaking ethno-religious community of Yazidis, Sultan Ezid is a highly revered divine figure. Most modern historians hold that the name Ezid derives from the name of Caliph Yazid. In Yazidi religious lore, there is no trace of any link between Sultan Ezid and the second Umayyad caliph. A pro-Umayyad movement particularly sympathetic towards Yazid existed in the Kurdish mountains before the 12th century, when Sheikh Adi ibn Musafir, a mystic venerated by Yazidis to this day, settled there and attracted a following among the adherents of the movement. The name Yazidi seems to have been applied to the group because of his Umayyad origins.

== Coins and inscriptions ==
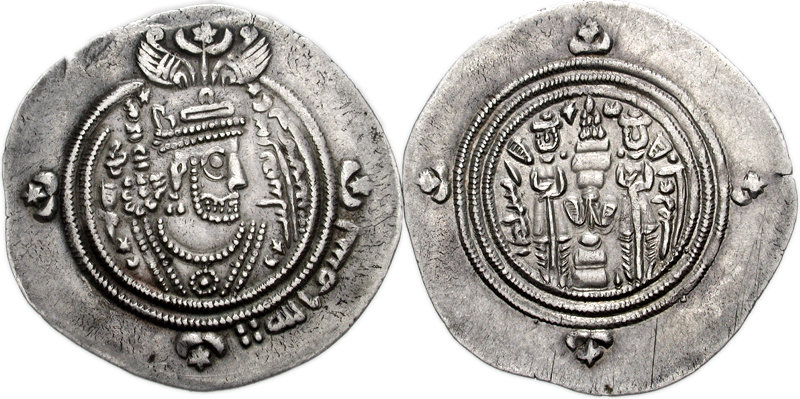
Coin of the Umayyad Caliphate at the time of Yazid. Mint location: Basra. Governor: Ubayd Allah ibn Ziyad. Date: 60 AH (679–680 CE). Obverse: Sasanian style bust imitating Khosrow II; bismillah and four pellets in margin. Reverse: fire altar with ribbons and attendants; star and crescent flanking flames; date to left, mint name to right.

A Sasanian-style silver coin bearing the mint date as "Year I of Yazid" has been reported. The obverse side shows the portrait of the Sasanian king Khosrow II (r. 590–628) and his name in the Pahlavi script. The reverse has the usual Zoroastrian fire altar surrounded by attendants. The margins, however, contain the inscription that it was minted during the first year of Yazid's reign. An anonymous coin from the Nishapur mint bearing the mint date 60, which is assumed to be the Hijri year, is also thought to be from Yazid's first regnal year. Other coins from his reign usually have only the name of the governor of the province where the coin originated. Coins bearing the name of the counter-caliph Abd Allah ibn al-Zubayr have also been found from the provinces of Fars and Kirman, dated between 61 and 63 (681–683 CE), although Ibn al-Zubayr did not publicly claim the caliphate until after the death of Yazid. This may show that as well as the challenges to his rule in Arabia and Iraq, Yazid's authority was also challenged in southern Persia from roughly the time of his accession. The coins were probably minted in the name of Ibn al-Zubayr to lend legitimacy to the challengers of the Umayyads by using a suitable Qurayshite name. (Note: Qurayshite descent was considered a prerequisite for the caliphal office by the majority of Muslims in early Islamic history.)

Yazid is thought to be mentioned in a short, undated Paleo-Arabic Christian graffito known as the Yazid inscription. It reads "May God be mindful of Yazid the king".

== Wives and children ==
Yazid married three women and had several concubines. The names of two of his wives are known: Umm Khalid Fakhita bint Abi Hisham and Umm Kulthum, a daughter of the veteran commander and statesman Abd Allah ibn Amir. Fakhita and Umm Kulthum both hailed from the Abd Shams, the parent clan of the Umayyads.

Yazid had three sons from his wives. His eldest, Mu'awiya II, was between 17 and 23 years old at the time of Yazid's death. The name of Mu'awiya II's mother is unknown, but she was from the Banu Kalb. Ill health prevented him from carrying out the caliphal duties and he rarely left his residence. He survived his father only by a few months and died without leaving any offspring. Yazid's second son, Khalid, was from Fakhita, and was born circa 668. Marwan married Fakhita after becoming caliph, to foster an alliance with the Sufyanid house and neutralize her son Khalid's claim to the caliphate. He remained quiet about being sidelined from the succession, although a legendary report says that he protested to Marwan, who in turn insulted him. He had friendly relations with Abd al-Malik, whose daughter he married. Several legendary accounts report Khalid being interested in alchemy and having ordered the translation of Greek works on alchemy, astronomy, and medicine into Arabic. Yazid's daughter Atika was the favourite wife of Abd al-Malik. They had several children, including the future Caliph Yazid II (r. 720–724). Yazid's son Abd Allah, from Umm Kulthum, was a famed archer and horseman. Yazid had several other sons from slave women. (Note: The names of Yazid's sons from his slave women were Abd Allah al-Asghar, Umar, Abu Bakr, Utba, Harb, Abd al-Rahman, al-Rabi and Muhammad.)

Sufyanids

Caliph Uthman (r. 644–656) | Abu Sufyan | Prophet Muhammad
Amr | Hanzala | Yazid | Amr | Mu'awiya I | Anbasa | Utba | Muhammad | Ramla
Ramla | Abd Allah | Yazid I (r. 680–683) | Uthman | Al-Walid | Uthman
Abd al-Malik (r. 685–705) | Atika | Mu'awiya II (r. 683–684) | Khalid | Abd Allah | Abd Allah | Qasim | Yazid | Atika
Yazid II (r. 720–724) | Abd Allah | Harb | Yazid | Ziyad | Muhammad | Umm Yazid | Sulayman (r. 715–717) | Abda | Hisham (r. 724–743)
Al-Walid II (r. 743–744) | Ali | Abu Sufyan | Abu Sufyan | Hashim | Abbas | Yazid
Qasim | Sa'id | Mu'awiya
Uthman

Dashed line indicates marriage
Italicized indicates female
Sufyanid caliphs
Marwanid caliphs
Nominated successors to the caliph
Sufyanid claimants to the caliphate during Abbasid rule

Yazid I Umayyad Dynasty Born: 646 Died: 11 November 683
| Preceded by Mu'awiya I | Caliph of Islam; Umayyad Caliph; 680 – 11 November 683 | Succeeded by Mu'awiya II |
