= Muslim ibn Uqba =

Umayyad Caliphate general (died 683)

- Born: pre-622
- Died: 683; Mushallal, Hejaz
- Relatives: Banu Murra (tribe)
- Military career
- Allegiance: Mu'awiya I (657–661); Umayyad Caliphate (661–683)
- Conflicts: First Fitna; Battle of Siffin (657); Second Fitna; Battle of al-Harra (683)

Muslim ibn Uqba al-Murri (Arabic: مُسْلِم بْنِ عُقْبَة الْمُرِّيّ, romanized: Muslim ibn ʿUqba al-Murrī; pre-622–683) was a general of the Umayyad Caliphate during the reigns of caliphs Mu'awiya I (r. 661–680) and his son and successor Yazid I (r. 680–683). The latter assigned Muslim, a staunch loyalist who had distinguished himself at the Battle of Siffin, to be the commander of an expedition against the people of Medina for refusing to give Yazid the oath of allegiance. The victory of Umayyad forces at the Battle of al-Harra in 683 and the subsequent pillaging of Medina by his army was considered among the major injustices carried out by the Umayyads. Muslim died shortly after.

== Life ==
Details about Muslim's early life and career are scant. He was most likely born before the Hijra in 622, the start of the Islamic calendar. He was the son of a certain Uqba of the Banu Murra, a branch of the Arab tribe of Ghatafan. Muslim most likely moved to Syria from Arabia during the Muslim conquest of the region in the 630s. He became a committed partisan of the Umayyad clan of the province's governor, Mu'awiya ibn Abi Sufyan. During the First Muslim Civil War, Muslim distinguished himself at the head of a contingent of Syrian infantry in Mu'awiya's army at the Battle of Siffin in Upper Mesopotamia against Caliph Ali (r. 656–661) and his supporters. However, he was unable to wrest control from the latter of the Dumat al-Jandal oasis in northern Arabia during a later battle. When Mu'awiya became caliph in 661, he gave Muslim the lucrative post of land tax collector in Palestine, though he was known not to have taken advantage of this post for self-enrichment. Later, when Mu'awiya was on his deathbed, he made Muslim and the governor of Damascus, al-Dahhak ibn Qays al-Fihri, regents until his son and chosen successor, Yazid I (r. 680–683), returned to Syria from the battlefield with the Byzantines in Anatolia.

Mu'awiya died in 680 and Yazid acceded as caliph, though this dynastic succession, until then unprecedented in the caliphate, was not recognized by the Ansar (the Islamic prophet Muhammad's early supporters in Medina). Muslim was sent at the head of an embassy by Yazid to bring the people of Medina into line with his rule, but this attempt was rebuffed. In response, Yazid again dispatched Muslim, this time as the commander of an expeditionary army, to subdue the people of Medina and Mecca. At the time, Muslim was elderly and ill and had to be transported in a litter. En route to Medina, Muslim encountered a group of Umayyads at Wadi al-Qura who had been expelled from the town. They aided him with information about Medina's defenses. When he reached the town's outskirts, he encamped his army at Harrat Waqim, where he commenced three days of negotiations with the Ansar and Quraysh opponents of Yazid. When the negotiations failed, Muslim drew up plans for battle, which occurred on 26 August 683 and became known as the Battle of al-Harra. The Ansar took the advantage in the early part of the battle, but were ultimately routed by Muslim's Syrian forces, who pursued the survivors into Medina. Muslim's troops subsequently plundered the city before he reined them in the following day. Afterward, he prosecuted the captive leaders of the revolt. Following his victory, Muslim put one of his deputies, Rawh ibn Zinba al-Judhami, in charge of Medina, while he set off for Mecca to subdue the rebel leader Abd Allah ibn al-Zubayr. On the way, he fell ill at Mushallal and transferred command of the army to his deputy Husayn ibn Numayr al-Sakuni. He died soon after and was buried in Mushallal, where his tomb long became a target of stone-throwing by passersby.

== Assessment ==
In Islamic tradition, the pillaging of Medina, one of Islam's holiest cities, by Muslim's army was one of the major crimes committed by the Umayyads. Muslim is the only person to be explicitly cursed in the work of the Sunni Muslim historian Khalifa ibn Khayyat, who accused the general of committing a massacre and other major injustices in Medina. Islamic historians who sympathized with Shia Islam often disparagingly referred to him as "Musrif" (spendthrift or irresponsible actor), a play on his given name. However, in the typically contrarian fashion of Orientalists, the 20th-century Orientalist historian Henri Lammens dismissed the descriptions of Muslim and his actions in Medina by medieval Muslim sources as "exaggerations". He considered Muslim to be largely incorruptible and one of the Arab generals "whose talents contributed so much to establish the power of the Umayyads". He further asserted that Muslim’s career shows him to be “a convinced Muslim of a rectitude rare in this period of unsettlement, which saw so many extraordinary vicissitudes of fortune and wavering loyalties".

== Bibliography ==
- Anderson, Tobias (2018). Early Sunnī Historiography: A Study of the Tārīkh of Khalīfa b. Khayyāṭ. Brill. ISBN 978-90-04-38316-6.
- Gil, Moshe (1997) [1983]. A History of Palestine, 634–1099. Translated by Ethel Broido. Cambridge: Cambridge University Press. ISBN 0-521-59984-9.
- Hawting, Gerald R. (2000). The First Dynasty of Islam: The Umayyad Caliphate AD 661–750 (Second ed.). London and New York: Routledge. ISBN 0-415-24072-7.
- Lammens, H. (1993). "Muslim b. ʿUḳba". In Bosworth, C. E.; van Donzel, E.; Heinrichs, W. P. & Pellat, Ch. (eds.). The Encyclopaedia of Islam, Second Edition. Volume VII: Mif–Naz. Leiden: E. J. Brill. pp. 693–694. ISBN 978-90-04-09419-2.
