= Mudar ibn Nizar =

Eponymous ancestor of Mudar

Mudar ibn Nizar مضر بن نزار
- Born: Arabia
- Died: Arabia
- Burial: al-Rawha, Arabia
- Issue: Ilyas ibn Mudar (father of Mudrikah ibn Ilyas); Aylan al-Nas
- Father: Nizar ibn Ma'add ibn Adnan
- Mother: Sawda bint Akk ibn Adnan

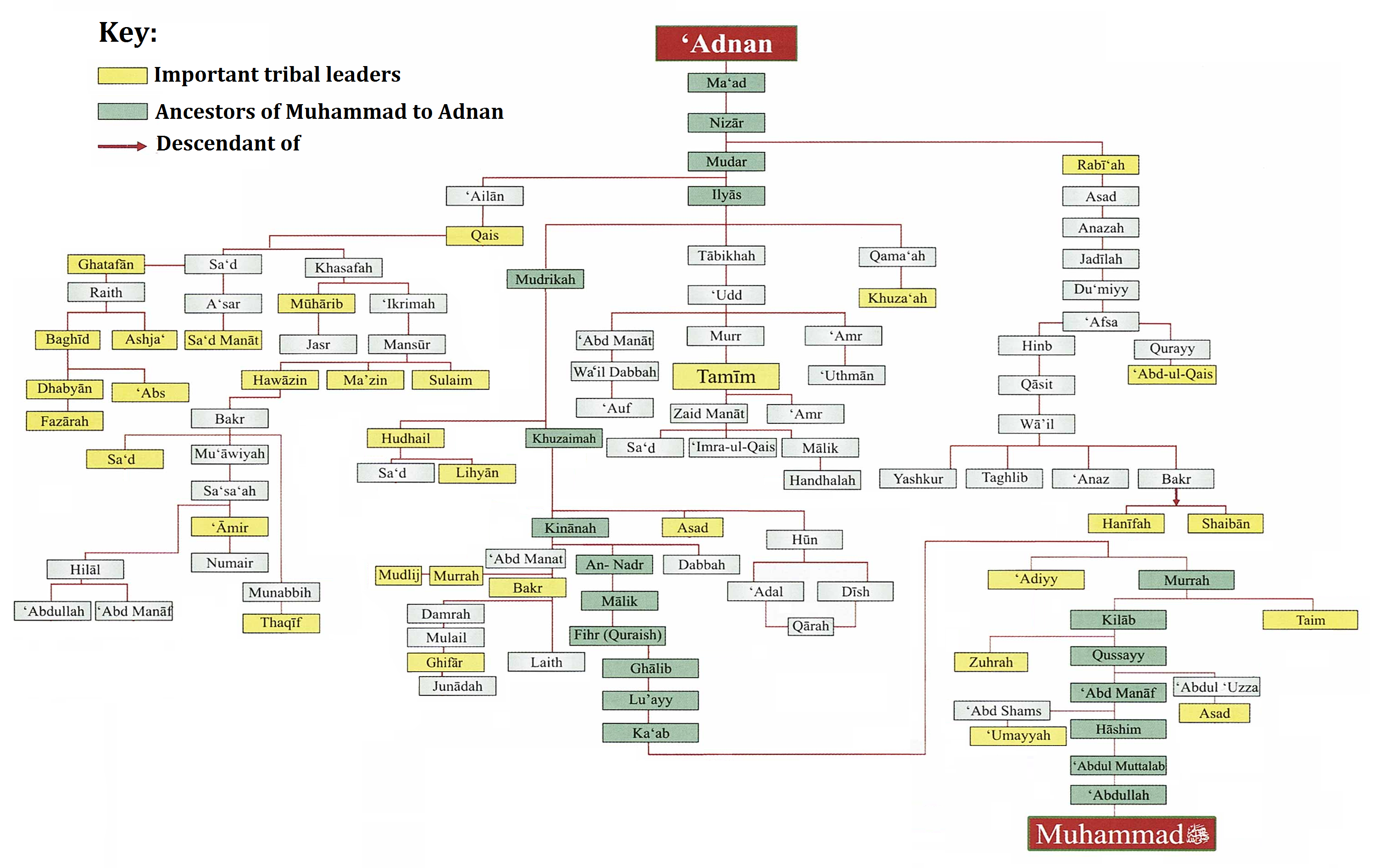
Family tree from Adnan to Muhammad

Mudar ibn Nizar (Arabic: مضر بن نزار) is the traditional eponymous ancestor of the Mudar, one of the most powerful northern Arab tribal groupings.

== History ==
The tradition states that Muhammad was the son of 'Abdullah, b. 'Abdu'I-Muttalib (whose name was Shayba), b. Hashim (whose name was 'Amr), b. Abd Manaf (whose name was al-Mughira), b. Qusay (whose name was Zayd), b. Kilab, b. Murrah, b. Ka'b, b. Lu'ayy, b. Ghalib, b. Fihr, b. Malik, b. al-Nadr, b. Kinana, b. Khuzayma, b. Mudrika (whose name was 'Amir), b. Ilyas, b. Mudar, b. Nizar, b. Ma'add, b. Adnan, b. Udd (or Udad),.... b. Qedar, b. Isma'il, b. Ibrahim, the friend of the Compassionate.

== Ancestor ==
According to the Arab genealogists, Mudar was the son of Nizar ibn Ma'ad ibn Adnan by Sawda bint Akk ibn Adnan. He had one full brother, Iyad, and two half-brothers, Rabi'a (who gave his name to the other major tribal grouping) and Anmar. A well-known story is told of how the brothers divided their heritage after their father's death, resulting in Mudar gaining the epithet "the Red" (al-ḥamrāʿ) because he received his father's red tent.

Mudar settled in Mecca, and was buried in al-Rawha, where his tomb became a site of pilgrimage in later centuries. Mudar had two sons: Ilyas (also known as al-Yas), and Aylan al-Nas. Through his sons, Ilyas was the ancestor of the Banu Hudhayl, Banu Asad, Banu Tamim, and Banu Kinana—which includes the Quraysh, the tribe of Muhammad and the early caliphs—while Aylan was the ancestor of the Qays tribes).

The Mudar and Rabi'a are recorded in central Arabia in the Arabic histories of the pre-Islamic period; the kings of the Kindah bore the title of "king of the Ma'add (or Mudar) and Rabi'a", and they played a role in the conflicts with the Yemeni (southern Arab) tribes.

== Sources ==
- Kindermann, H. (1995). "Rabīʾā and Muḍar". In Bosworth, C. E.; van Donzel, E.; Heinrichs, W. P. & Lecomte, G. (eds.). The Encyclopaedia of Islam, Second Edition. Volume VIII: Ned–Sam. Leiden: E. J. Brill. pp. 352–354. ISBN 978-90-04-09834-3.
