= Khindif =

Tribal confederation of the Mudarite Arabs

Khindif خندف
- Adnanite Arabs
- Nisba: al-Khandafi (masculine) al-Khandafiyyah (feminine)
- Location: Parts of the Arabian Peninsula, now in present-day Saudi Arabia
- Descended from: Ilyas ibn Mudar
- Branches: From Mudrikah ibn Ilyas: Banu Hudhayl; Banu Kinana; Banu Asad; From Tabikha ibn Ilyas: Banu Tamim; From Qam'ah ibn Ilyas: Banu Khuza'ah (disputed)
- Religion: Islam (formerly South Arabian polytheism)

The Khindif (Arabic: خندف) also known as the Banu Ilyas ibn Mudar (Note: The Khindif were also known as the Banu Ilyas ibn Mudar, after their ancestor.) are a group of Mudarite Arab tribes that descend from the patriarch Ilyas ibn Mudar. The tribes of Banu Tamim, Banu Kinana, Banu Hudhayl and Banu Asad are amongst the various branches of the Khindif group. The Khindif are also ancestors of the Quraysh tribal confederation.

== Tribal lineage ==
The Khindif are named for Khindif Laila, who was the wife of Ilyas ibn Mudar. Their full lineage, according to genealogists, is: Ilyas, son of Mudar, son of Nizar, son of Ma'ad, son of Adnan. As evident from their lineage, they are descended from Adnan which makes them Adnanite Arabs. Adnan's descent from Ishmael confirms them as amongst the Ishmaelites, or the "Arabized Arabs" of the Hijaz region.

=== Branches ===
Khindif Laila gave birth to three sons, Mudrikah, Tabikha, and Qam'ah. According to Muslim historian and genealogist Ibn Ishaq, the three sons were originally named Amir, 'Amr and Umayr respectively but their names were changed later on.

- Mudrikah was the ancestor of the Banu Hudhayl tribe as well as the Banu Kinana and the Banu Asad.
- Tabikha was the ancestor of the Banu Tamim tribe and its divisions, including the Banu Dabbah tribe.
- Qum'ah is said to have been the ancestor of the Banu Khuza'ah; but there is dispute to whether the Khuza'ah were even of Adnanite or Qahtanite descent. A group of genealogists and scholars believe the Banu Khuza'ah were descended from Qahtan. However, others believe that they were descended from Adnan through 'Amr ibn Luhayy who is from the descendants of Qam'ah. Badr al-Din al-Ayni resolves the dispute by attributing 'Amr as an adoptive grandson of Haritha al-Azdi; hence making 'Amr ibn Luhayy a Qahtanite by adoption and Adnanite by birth (so the descent from Qam'ah is still acknowledged).

== History ==
In ancient times, the Khindif resided in the Arabian Peninsula in the region of the Tihamah. However, the tribes descended of Mudrikah managed to expel the tribes that were descended of Tabikha from the Tihamah. The Tabikhites resided in the region of Al-Yamama afterwards. The Quraysh, descendants of Mudrikah, held prominence in Mecca from the late 6th century until the rise of Islam; which was led by the Islamic prophet Muhammad, himself from the descendants of Mudrikah (hence making him among the Khindifites as well).

=== Religion ===
Currently, the Khindif are a mainly Muslim tribe.

In the pre-Islamic times, the ancestor of the Khindif tribes, Ilyas, was a monotheist who abhorred the worship of idols. But many years after his death, his descendants would be the first amongst the Arabs to worship the statues of Suwa' and Hubal. Minority converted to Christianity, for example Waraqah ibn Nawfal from the Quraysh tribe. Members of the Khindif would later convert to Islam starting from the 7th century CE.

== Dynasties ==
=== From Mudrikah ===
- Umayyads - ruling dynasty of the Umayyad Caliphate from the Quraysh which formerly ruled Arabia and Syria
- Hashemites – current ruling dynasty of Jordan since 1921
- Sultans of Brunei – starting from 1425, the Sultans ruling Brunei were a dynasty descended from Muhammad

=== From Tabikha ===
- Al Thani – the current ruling dynasty of Qatar since 1847
- Aghlabids – ruling dynasty of Ifriqiya (800–909)
- Al Mu'ammar – ruling dynasty of Najd (1818–1820)
- Al ash-Sheikh – dynasty of clerics and scholars descended from Muhammad ibn Abd al-Wahhab, who is from the Banu Tamim

== See also ==
- Tribes of Arabia
- Adnanites
- Mudar
- Rabi'a
- Quraysh
