= Amr ibn Luhay =

Leader of the Banu Khuza'ah tribe

'Amr ibn Luhayy al-Khuza'i عمرو بن لُحَيّ الخزاعي
- Born: 'Amr ibn Luhayy ibn Qam'ah ibn Ilyas ibn Mudar ibn Nizar ibn Ma'add ibn Adnan al-Khuza'i
- Died: Unknown, maybe c. 3rd or 4th centuries CE; Arabian Peninsula
- Other name: Abu al-Asnam (Father of Idols)
- Occupations: Tribal chief and priest
- Known for: Introducing the worship of Hubal and other idols into the Hijaz and Mecca
- Parent: Qam'ah ibn Ilyas
- Relatives: Ilyas ibn Mudar (grandfather); Mudrikah (uncle); Khuzaymah (cousin)

'Amr ibn Luhayy al-Khuza'i (Arabic: عمرو بن لُحَيّ الخزاعي, lit. 'Amr, son of Luhayy, the Khuzaite') was a chief of the Banu Khuza'ah, a tribe originating in pre-Islamic Arabia. 'Amr gained an infamous reputation in Islamic tradition due to him being cited by traditional Arabic sources as the first person to introduce idolatry into the Hijaz. He was also known as Abu al-Asnam (Father of Idols).

== Biography ==
=== Family ===
The full lineage of 'Amr ibn Luhayy has been listed by several genealogists as: 'Amr, son of Luhayy, son of Qam'ah, son of Ilyas, son of Mudar, son of Nizar, son of Ma'ad, son of Adnan. Hence we can see that 'Amr is a descendant of Adnan, from the Mudar tribal group. Ibn Ishaq also adds on that Mudrikah ibn Ilyas and Khuzaymah are the uncle and cousin of 'Amr, respectively; while Ilyas ibn Mudar is his great-grandfather.

=== Tribal affiliation ===
'Amr ibn Luhayy is associated with the Banu Khuza'ah tribe, as evidenced by his nisba, al-Khuza'i. However, the Banu Khuza'ah are a Qahtanite tribal group and hence are not paternally descended from Adnan. Muslim Hanafi scholar Badr al-Din al-Ayni, in his commentary on Hadiths involving the Khuza'ah, explains that 'Amr ibn Luhayy was the son of Luhayy, an adoptive son of an Azdite chief named Haritha, son of Muzayqiya. Badr al-Din al-Ayni further explains that the wife of the Adnanite Arab chief, Qam'ah ibn Ilyas, gave birth to Luhayy while she was staying with Haritha ibn Muzayqiya; Luhayy was adopted by Haritha afterwards hence 'Amr ibn Luhayy is Qahtanite by adoption and Adnanite by birth. Ibn 'Abd al-Barr, however, takes a different approach by claiming that 'Amr is a great-grandson of Muzayqiya. Ibn Hajar al-Asqalani agrees, and considered Qahtan himself to be a descendant of Nebaioth.

=== Nicknames ===
'Amr became known by the title Abu al-Asnam (Father of Idols) by later Muslim authors.

== Introduction of idol worship into Arabia ==
The traditional Arabic sources, from later post-Islamic periods, cite 'Amr as being the first one to introduce idolatry into the Arabian Peninsula and change the religion of the Arabs from monotheism to polytheism.

The traditional account goes as follows: It starts off with 'Amr going to Moab and meeting with the people there, who are called by the name of "Amaliq, sons of "Imlaq". He asked what they were doing, to which they responded they were worshipping idols, and that when they prayed for rain, they got it, 'Amr, impressed at the supposed rain-making capacities of these idols, asked if he could take one home, the Amaliq obliged, and he was allowed to take home one of their idols, Hubal, which he then sets up in Mecca for the Arabs to worship, which he demanded they do. With the help of a companion from the jinn, 'Amr manages to locate and dig up the idols of the people of Noah that were supposedly buried on the coast of Jeddah. He then distributes the idols to other tribes who build temples to house the newly discovered idols. Then, after a while, all of the Arabs begin worshipping the idols and forgetting about the religion of their ancestor, Abraham.

One of the few scholars who disagreed with this story was Ibn al-Kalbi, who agreed that it was 'Amr who introduced the idolatry, but he credited Khuzaymah ibn Mudrikah as being the first one to set up the Hubal idol for worship (instead of 'Amr as stated in the above story).

== Time period ==
Claude Addas dates the lifetime to 'Amr to be around the 3rd centuries CE, basing her conclusion off a commentary of the Kitab al-Asnam of Ibn al-Kalbi. The 12th-century Kitāb al-Milal wa al-Nihal regards 'Amr as being a contemporary of the Sasanian king, Shapur Dhu al-Aktaf, which may place 'Amr as living in the 4th century CE. However, idol worship has been recorded in the Arabian Peninsula in earlier years, including Neo-Assyrian inscriptions that date to the reign of Assyrian kings Sennacherib and Esarhaddon which provide clear proof of the Qedarite Arabs worshipping idols.

== Islamic tradition ==
The fate of 'Amr in the afterlife as described by Muhammad was narrated in Sahih al-Bukhari by Abu Huraira:

Allah's Messenger, peace and blessings be upon Him, said: “I saw 'Amr ibn 'Amir al-Khuza'i dragging his intestines in the Fire; for he was the first one to release the animals [for the idols].

Bukhari himself agreed that the narration was authentic, as did later Hadith scholars like Muslim ibn al-Hajjaj and Ibn Hajar al-Asqalani.

== See also ==
- Religion in pre-Islamic Arabia
- Monotheism in pre-Islamic Arabia
- Hanif, a form of monotheism which completely rejected the worship of idols after they had been introduced in Arabia
