= Banu Khuza'ah =

Arab tribe prominent in Western Arabian

Banū Khuzāʿah بنو خزاعة
- Qahtanite Arabs
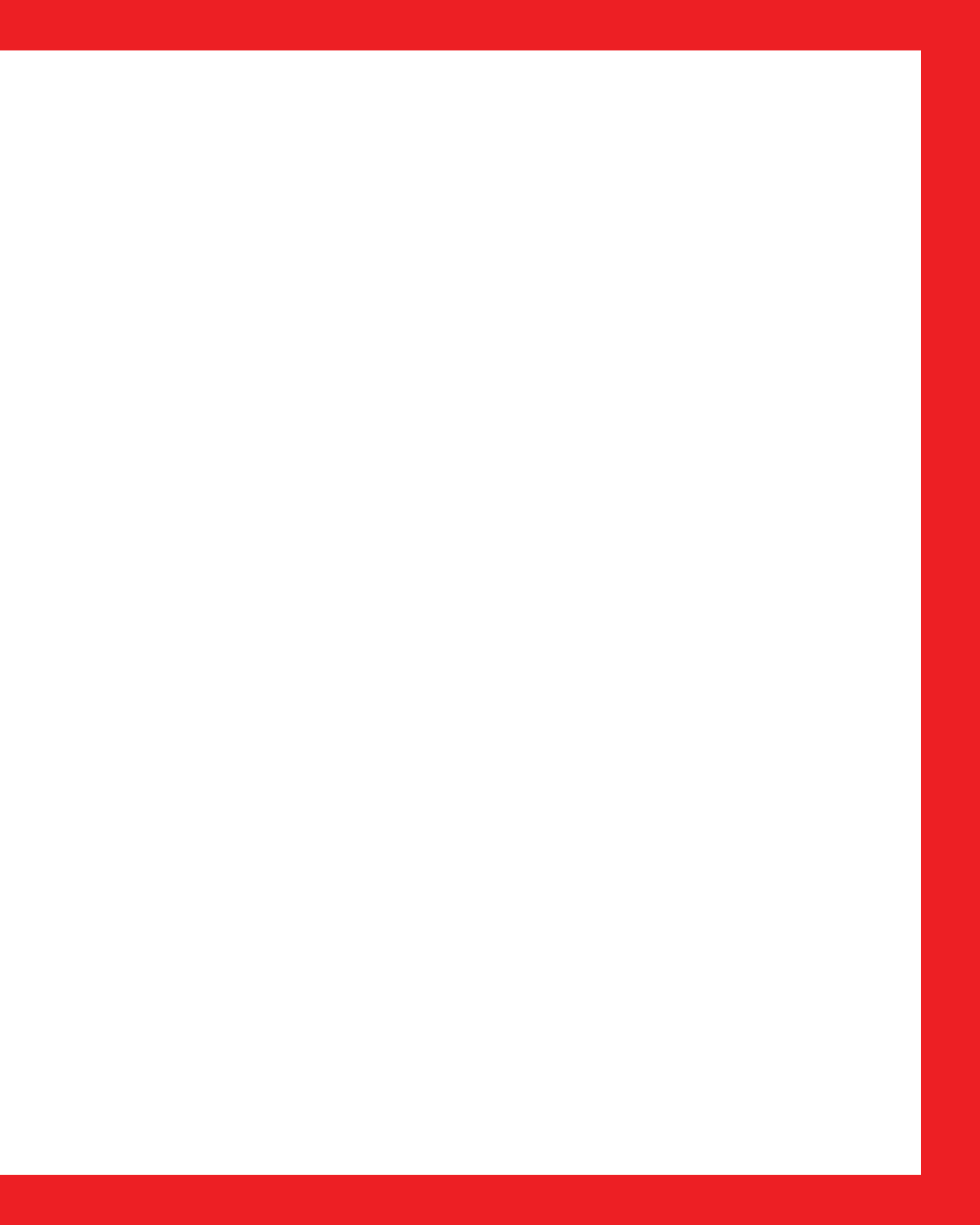
- Banner of Banu Khuzaʽa at the Battle of Siffin
- Ethnicity: Arab
- Nisba: Al-Khuzaʽi
- Location: Mecca, Arab world
- Descended from: Amr ibn Luḥay al-Khuzāʽī
- Religion: Islam

Map of the Arabian Peninsula in 600 AD, showing the various Arab tribes and their areas of settlement. The Lakhmids (yellow) formed an Arab monarchy as clients of the Sasanian Empire, while the Ghassanids (red) formed an Arab monarchy as clients of the Roman Empire A map published by the British academic Harold Dixon during World War I, showing the presence of the Arab tribes in West Asia, 1914

The Banū Khuzāʿah (Arabic: بنو خزاعة, singular خزاعيّ Khuzāʿī) are an Azdite, Qahtanite tribe, one of the main ancestral tribes of Arabia. They ruled Mecca and were the Kings of Hejaz for 500 years, before the Islamic prophet Muhammad, and many members of the tribe now live in and around that city. Others are also present in significant numbers in countries such as Iraq, Palestine, and Jordan, but can also be found across the Middle East.

The Banu Khuza'ah acted as the Custodians of Mecca before the Quraysh. The ruling royal family of the tribe were the kings of the Kingdom of Khaza'il (Khuza'ah), known as the Kingdom of the Middle and Lower Euphrates by Britain, from 1534 to 1921.

== The Lineage of Banu Khuza'ah ==
Most traditionalists trace the origins of the tribe to Amr ibn Luhay, and agree that, with the other branches of the Azd, they at some point, left Yemen and moved north. Amr ibn Luhay and his clan settled themselves around Mecca. A date of around the 5th century can be set for that settlement, although traditionalists place it at an earlier date by giving particularly long lives to some of its leaders.

The opinions of genealogists vary concerning the ancestry and origins of the Banu Khuza'a; some say that they were descended from Qahtan and others say they are from Adnan. We will present both opinions here:

=== The first group ===
Al-Mubarrid held the opinion that Khuza'a are descendants of Amr bin Rabiah, and he was known as Luhay and belonged to the Azd; Ibn al-Athīr al-Jazarī agrees with him, saying: "They were called Khuza'a because they broke away from the Azd when they all left Yemen at the time of the flood of ˁIram" (the breach of the Marib dam). Yāqūt al-Ḥamawī says the same, but states that they are Qahtanites. Al-Qalqashandī states: "Khuza'a are a tribe from the Azd, from the Qahtanites."

Ibn 'Abd al-Birr states that Ibn al-Kalbi held the opinion that: "Amr bin Luhay, for Luhay was his name, is Rabiah ibn Ḥārithah bin Amr; and he is Mā' al-Samā' ibn Ḥārithah bin Imra' al-Qays bin Tha'labah bin Māzin bin al-Azd bin Ghawth bin al-Nabit bin Mālik bin Zayd bin Kaḥlān bin Saba' bin Yashjab bin Ya'rab bin Qaḥṭān, so he is the ancestor of all of Khuza'a, and they broke away from him." It is suggested that one of the strongest proofs for this is that the Khuza'a themselves used to say: "We are the sons of Amr ibn Rabiah from the Yemen." Arabs linguists tended towards the opinion that the name of Khuza'a came from the phrase: khaza'a 'an aṣḥābihi (خزع عن أصحابه ), which means "he has lagged behind his companions (when they are walking)"; so they were called this because they were behind their people when they came from Marib.

Al-Zabīdī mentions what 'Awn ibn Ayūb al-Ansārī stated: فَلَمَّا هَبَطْنَا بَطْنَ مُرٍّ تَخَزَعَتْ خُزَاعَةٌ عَنّا فِيْ حُلُوْلِ كَرَاكِرَ (Fa-lammā habaṭnā baṭna murrin takhazza'at khuzā'atun 'annā fī ḥulūli Karākira : "And when we dismounted at Baṭn Murr Khuza'a had already stayed behind in the camp at Karākir.") It is said that ascribing Khuza'a to Qaḥṭān also agrees with this etymology of the name, whereas to say that they are descendants of 'Adnān makes such an etymology of the name meaningless.

=== The second group ===
Ibn Iṣḥaq is of the opinion that Khuza'a are the descendants of Amr ibn Luhay bin Qum'ah bin Ilyās bin Muḑar bin Nazār bin Ma'd bin 'Adnān; they would therefore be Muḑarites rather than Qaḥṭanites. Al-Muṣ'ab al-Zubayri also agrees with Ibn Iṣḥaq, saying that Qum'ah is 'Umayr, father of Khuza'a. This is supported by the opinion of Ibn Ḥazm, who related four prophetic traditions (Hadith) substantiating that Khuza'a were from Muḑar and not from Qaḥṭān:

Hadith 1: From Abū Hurayrah that Muhammad said: "'Amr ibn Luhay bin Qum'ah bin Khandaf is the father of Khuza'a."

Hadith 2: The statement of Muhammad: "I saw Amr bin Luhay bin Qum'ah bin Khandaf the father of those sons of Kaab, and he was dragging his intestines through hellfire." And those sons of Kaab are the ones about whom Ibn 'Abbās said: "The Quran was sent down in the dialect of Kaabs: Kaab bin Kaab bin Lu'ayy and Kaab bin Amr bin Luhay."

Hadith 3: The narration of Aktham ibn Abī Ḥabbūn al-Khuza'i, when Muhammad said to him, "O Aktham! I saw Rabiah ibn Luhay bin Qum'ah bin Khandaf dragging his intestines in the fire, and I have never seen any man more like him than you; nor more like you than him." Aktham asked: "Are you afraid that being like him will harm me, o Messenger of Allah?" And he replied: "No, you are a believer and he was an unbeliever …" And al-Muṣ'ab al-Zubayrī stood by this hadith saying that whatever Muhammad said was the truth. This is also supported by Ibn Khaldūn, who reiterates the statement of Qādi 'Ayyāḑ: "What is well known about this Khuza'a is that he is Amr bin Luhay bin Qum'ah bin Ilyās.

Hadith 4: The hadith of Salamah ibn al-Akwā', who said: "The Messenger of Allah (SAW) passed by a group of people from the tribe of Aslam who were practicing archery." And he said to them: "Throw Banī Ishmael, for your father was an archer, and I am with the sons of such-and-such a one …" Ibn Ḥazm said: "Now as for the first, the third and the fourth hadiths, they are all extremely authentic and reliable, and they cannot be rejected for the statements of the genealogists and others; and on the basis of these Khuza'a was one of the sons of Qum'ah bin Ilyās bin Muḑar.

Al-Suhaylī said that the hadith of Salamah was a strong proof for those who considered Khuza'a to be one of the sons of Qum'ah ibn Ilyās. And there is not the slightest doubt that the difference between the different genealogists stems from the fact that Salamah mentioned in the fourth hadith are the brothers of Khuza'a. And among the some more modern scholars who prefer to regard Khuza'a as one of the descendants of 'Adnān is 'Allāmah 'Abd al-Raḥmān bin Yaḥyā al-Mu'allamī al-Yamānī.

== Phratries (buṭūn) ==
In ancient times the tribe of Khuza'a was subdivided into a number of phratries (buṭūn):

- Banū Kalb bin 'Amr
  - Banū Salūl bin 'Amr
    - Banū Ḥabshah bin Salūl
      - Banū Qumayr bin Ḥabshah
      - Banū Ḑāṭar bin Ḥabshah
      - Banū Ḥalīl bin Ḥabshah
      - Banū Kulayb bin Ḥabshah
    - Banū ˁAddī bin Salūl
      - Banū Ḥabtar bin ˁAddī
      - Banū Haynah bin ˁAddī
  - Banū Ḥabshah bin Ka'b
    - Banū Ḥarām bin Ḥabshah
    - Banū Ghāḑirah bin Ḥabshah
  - Banū Sa'd bin Ka'b
  - Banū Māzin bin Ka'b
- Banū ˁAddī bin 'Amr
- Banū Malīḥ bin 'Amr: It is said that among them was Quraysh, one of the sons of al-Ṣalt bin Mālik bin al-Naḑar bin Kinānah"
- Banū 'Awf bin 'Amr
  - Banū Naḑr bin 'Awf
  - "Banū Jufnah bin 'Awf; and they were in al-Ḥīrah.
- Banū Sa'd bin 'Amr
  - Banū al-Muṣṭaliq bin Sa'd;the name of al-Muṣṭaliq was Judhaymah.
  - Banū al-Ḥayā' bin Sa'd; and the name of al-Ḥayā' was 'Amr

And Banu al-Muṣṭaliq and Banu al-Ḥayā' belong to the tribes who formed the Ḥalaf of Ḥabābish in Mecca.

== Camp sites and settlements ==
Geographical and historical works mention the locations that Khuza'a used to inhabit before and after the coming of Islam, since they were either Mecca, or adjoining it or in the mountains, watering holes and wadis around it. A number of other Arab tribes used to share these places with them, such as the Quraysh in Mecca, and Kinanah in Jabal al-Abwā' and Murr al-Ẓahrān and Qudayd. The Arab tribes in general often used to move from one area to another in search of water, something that sometimes led to tribes sharing certain spots. And among the campsites of Khuza'ah were:

- Murr al-Ẓahrān
- 'Asifān
- Qudayd
- Al-Watīr
- Al-Maraysī'
- Khalīṣ
- Ghazzāl
- Ghaḑūr
- Ghalā'il
- Al-Ghurābāt
- Ghadīr Khumm
- Muhaymah (al-Juḥfah)
- Al-Abwā'
- Muḥammar
- Shanā'iq
- Shaqrā
- Al-Shabbāk
- Dawrān
- Khayf Salām
- Khayf al-Ni'am
- Nadā
- Nashāq
- Al-Mashqar
- Amaj
- Shahad
- 'Abab
- Shamnaṣīr
- Harshī
- Bayyin

== Rule of the Banu Khuza'ah over Mecca ==
After Hagar and her son Ishmael had settled in Mecca, the tribe of Jurhum happened to pass through there and agreed with Hagar that they should remain there, as a new spring of fresh water had emerged at that location. They settled in Mecca and in the area around. Once Ishmael had become a youth, he married a woman of the tribe of Jurhum. Ishmael was the custodian of the Kaaba, and after he died he made his son Nabit his successor. After Nabit, the job was given to his uncles from Jurhum, and with them were the descendants of Ishmael. Then Mudadh ibn Amr al-Jurhamī assumed the burden of the affairs of the Sacred House.

Jurhum's custodianship of the Sanctuary lasted for some time, but they then started to become weaker in faith, putting the continuing sanctity of the Sacred House in peril. They considered all the funds collected at the Sanctuary to be their property, and started to perform sinful acts within its precincts. It came to the point where a man and a woman, called Asaf and Na'ilah, performed coitus in the Sacred House, and according to the Muslim sources Allah turned them into two stones to punish them for this sacrilegious act. Their aggression against the sanctity of the Sanctuary was the catalyst that made the Banu Bakr bin 'Abd al-Manāf bin Kinanah, descendants of Ishmael, join with Khuza'a in fighting Jurhum, and they expelled them from Mecca.

After the Jurhumites had fled, Khuza'a became custodians of the Sacred House, passing the duty on from father to son for a long time, five hundred years it is said. The first one of Khuza'a to govern the Sacred House was Amr bin Rabiah (Luhay) who travelled to Syria-Palestine (al-Shām) to seek a cure for a disease he was suffering from; he found the people there worshiping idols, and he liked this religion, so he brought back an idol called Hubal back to Mecca and called on the people to worship it. Hubal had the figure of an old man with a long beard and was made of carnelian. Its right hand had been cut off but the Quraysh would later provide it with a hand made of gold. Amr ibn Rabi'ah was the first to change the religion of the Arabs. Muslims historians consider that the people of Mecca were following the monotheistic religion of Ibrāhīm and Ismā'īl up to this point (see Hanif), when polytheism was introduced. Amr ibn Luhay became very famous among the other Arab tribes, because he fed all the pilgrims to the Sacred House, and distributed Yemeni cloaks to them. Many of the tribes started to visit Mecca on pilgrimage, and took their own idols with them, placing them around the Kaaba to worship.

It is narrated that Banu Qays Aylan bin MuDar coveted the Sacred House and they came one day in a great mass, accompanied by some other tribes, intending to seize it. At that time the leader of Banu Qays Aylan was Amr ibn al-Zarb al-'Udwānī. Khuza'a went out to fight them, and a battle ensued, and finally the Banu Qays Aylan fled.

Similarly, a group of the Hawāzin also launched a raid on the Banu Datir bin Habshah, one of the Banu Khuza'a, just after the Hawāzin had attacked the Banu Malūḥ (who belonged to Kinanah); then the Banu Datir and a group of Khuza'a raided the Hawāzin and killed many men. On another occasion the Hawazin raided Khuza'a, and they fought at al-Mahsab near Mina; they succeeded in beating the Banu 'Unqa' and some of the Banu Datir from Khuza'a. During this time the Khuza'a tribe controlled the region from the West of Medina to the Red Sea.

=== Passing control of Mecca to Quraysh ===
Quraysh, the descendants of Al-Nadr bin Kinanah, were dispersed at that time throughout Mecca and the surrounding area. This changed when Qusay bin Kilab got betrothed to Hubay bint Halil bin Habshah bin Salul bin Kaab bin Amr al-Khuza'i; he married her and at that time her father was in charge of the Kaabah, so Quṣay was later able to take over the custody of the Sanctuary. There are three different versions of the story of how Quṣay managed to seize this custody:

1. Ibn Isḥaq states that Quṣay became wealthy, his sons were dispersed all over Mecca, and he was held in great respect. After the death of Ḥalīl, Qusay thought he had more right to govern Mecca than Khuzā'a since the tribe of Quraysh were the cream of the sons of Ishmael son of Ibrāhīm and he was their pure descendant. The sons of Kinanah and Quraysh joined to help him to expel Khuza'a and Banu Bakr from Mecca. He sent a message to his stepbrother, Razah bin Rabiah, asking him to assist, and he did indeed come. Razah rushed to Mecca with his tribe from Quda'a, to help his brother in the war against Khuza'a.

2. Al-Azraqī mentions that Ḥalil liked Quṣay, and gave him his daughter's hand during his lifetime. Quṣay became the father of Abd al-Dar, Abd Manaf and Abd al-Uzza among others. Now when Ḥalīl became old he used to give the key of the Kaabah to his daughter, and she would pass it to her husband to open up the Sacred House. When Ḥalīl was dying he considered the fact that Quṣay had so many offspring and that they were well established, and he bequeathed him control of the Sanctuary, giving him the key. Now when Khuza'ah found out about this they refused to give the control of the Sacred House to Quṣay, and they took the key from Hubay. Now Quṣay quickly went to his people the Quraysh and Banu Kinanah and sought their help against Khuza'a, and he also sent for his brother to come from the territory of Quḑa'ah to assist.

3. Abu Hilāl al-'Askerī relates that when Ḥalīl became old, he passed control of the Sacred House to Abū Ghabshān Salīm bin Amr al-Khuza'i, and one day he and Quṣay were drinking together; now when he became drunk Quṣay bought the control of the Sacred House from him for a skinful of wine and a young camel. As a result there was a saying: "More damaging than the transaction of Abū Ghabshān." These individual accounts, when collated show that Qusay was getting ready to seize the Sacred House from Khuza'ah, and Khuza'ah set out to fight Quṣay, Quraysh, Kinanah and his allies from Quḑaa'ah. There was a fierce battle which was known as "The Day of Abṭaḥ" (Yawm Abṭaḥ); there were many casualties on both sides but the army of Quṣay was victorious. Finally both sides decided that they should seek a ruling about what to do; they consulted the leader of Banu Kinanah, Ya'mar bin 'Awf bin Kaab bin 'Āmir bin Layth bin Bakr bin 'Abd Manāt bin Kinanah, and he decide that Quṣay should forget all the injuries sustained by him and his men, and that in recompense for the blood of Khuza'a spilled by Quṣay's army blood money was due; but Khuza'ah should pass on the rule of Mecca to Quṣay. This event occurred in the 5th century CE.

The Khuza'a remained allies of the Quraysh, and in 570, the Year of the Elephant, took part in the battle against Abrahah.

In 630, the Khuza'a were attacked by the Banu Bakr, allies of the Quraysh. Since the Khuza'a had recently formed an alliance with Muhammad (referred to in the Quran), this attack constituted a breach of the Treaty of Ḥudaybīyah of 628, that had brought about a truce between the Muslims and the Quraish and forbade hostilities between the two groups and their respective allies. This led to the conquest of Mecca by the Muslim armies, which occurred without a battle. The Banu Mustaliq was a branch of Banu Khuza'a. They occupied the territory of Qudayd on the Red Sea shore between Jeddah and Rābigh.

== During Muhammad's era ==
The Banu Khuza'a fought in the Battle of the Trench. The Banu Nadir began rousing the nomads of Najd. The Nadir enlisted the Ghatafan confederacy by paying them half of their harvest. This contingent, the second largest, added a strength of about 2000 men and 300 horsemen led by Unaina bin Hasan Fazari. The Banu Assad also agreed to join, led by Tuleha Asadi. From the Banu Sulaym, the Nadir secured 700 men, though this force would likely have been much larger had not some of its leaders been sympathetic towards Islam. The Banu Amir, who had a pact with Muhammad, refused to join.

Other tribes included the Banu Murra, with 400 men led by Hars ibn Auf Murri, and the Banu Shuja, with 700 men led by Sufyan ibn Abd Shams. In total, the strength of the Confederate armies, though not agreed upon by scholars, is estimated to have included around 10,000 men and six hundred horsemen. At the end of March 627 the army, which was led by Abu Sufyan, marched on Medina. In accordance with the plan the armies began marching towards Medina, Meccans from the south (along the coast) and the others from the east. At the same time, horsemen from the Banu Khuza'a left to warn Medina of the invading army.

== Connection with the genealogy of Muhammad ==
The genealogy of Muhammad is connected to that of Khuza'a in two ways: firstly by way of his third great-grandfather Abd Manaf bin Qusay; and also through his marriage to the 'Mother of the Believers' Juwayrīyah, daughter of al-Ḥārith al-Khuza'i.

== Role in the conquest of Mecca ==
At the time of the Truce of Hudaybiya, one of the conditions set down was: "Whoever wishes to enter into an agreement with Muhammad and into his covenant, then he should enter it; and whoever wishes to enter into an agreement with the Quraysh and into their covenant then he should enter it." And Khuza'a leaped up with enthusiasm, saying: "We are in agreement with Muhammad and in his [SAW] covenant!" While the Banu al-Di'l bin Bakr jumped up saying: "We are in agreement with the Quraysh and in their covenant!"

=== Quraysh break the truce ===
Now while the truce was still holding, the Banu al-Di'l bin Bakr took advantage of it, and wanted to take blood revenge from Khuza'a for something that had happened in the Pre-Islamic period; they surprised them at a watering hole belonging to Khuza'a at al-Watīr to the south of Mecca, and they killed twenty of their men. They were helped in this attack by Quraysh who supplied men and weapons; and Khuza'a were driven into the Sacred Territory (Ḥaram), where they were unable to continue fighting.

=== Khuza'ah seeks the aid of Muhammad ===
Amr bin Salim al-Khuza'i set out with forty mounted men of Khuza'a to inform Muhammad about what had happened to them. When Muhammad was among the people in the mosque, Amr recited a poem to him about the agreements and affiliations between them and Khuza'a.

=== Muhammad assists Khuza'ah and conquers Mecca ===
Then Muhammad said: "You have our help, O Amr ibn Salim!" He looked towards a cloud in the sky, saying: "This will make the victory of the Banu Kaab easy!"

Nawfil ibn Mu'awiyah al-Di'li al-Kinani apologized for his people saying: "The riders are lying to you." But Muhammad said: "Never mind about the riders. We have nobody, whether close relatives or not close, in Tihamah who has been better with us than Khuza'a!" Then he continued: "I would not receive succour if I failed to assist Banu Kaab from the very thing in which I need help." Muhammad coordinated a large coalition force including Muslims and some of the Bedouin tribes and they went to Mecca and conquered it. This was towards the end of January 630 CE (8 AH).

== Creation of Abbasid Empire ==
The Khaza'il played a substantial role in the establishment of the Abbasid Caliphate with some of the most senior positions under the Caliphs being held by members of the tribal family. This includes the Vizier to the Caliph, Master of Post, the holder of the Royal Seal, Governors of the Abbasid provinces and the Head of the Abbasid Armies among others.

== Kingdom of Khaza'il ==
The Kingdom of Khaza'il (Arabic: مملكة الخزاعل, romanized: Mamlakat al-Khaza'il), also known as the Emirate of Khaza'il (Arabic: إمارة الخزاعل, romanized: Imārat al-Khaza'il) to the Arabs and officially as the Kingdom of the Middle and Lower Euphrates (Arabic: مملكة الفرات الأوسط والأسفل, romanized: Mamlakat al-Furāt al-Awsaṭ wa-al-Asfal) by Britain, was an autonomous kingdom in present-day Iraq that resisted Ottoman colonial rule from the early 16th century to the early 20th century. Ruled by the Khaza'il Royal family, also known as the Banu Khuza'ah Sheikhly dynasty, the Kingdom exercised military, economic, and political sovereignty, particularly in the Middle and Lower Euphrates region.

Kingdom of Khaza'il shaded in Green showing its territorial boundaries at its peak during the late 17th to late 19th century from Anah to Basra.

At the height of their power in the 17th, 18th and 19th century, the Khaza'il ruled from the northern city of Anah to Basra, including the southern outskirts of Baghdad and all cities along both sides of the Euphrates River, controlling all cultivatable land and tribal forces in their territory. The Emirs of Khaza'il were known for their fierce armed resistance to Ottoman imperial authority lasting several centuries, vast land ownership, and their immense wealth established through the creation of Silk Road taxation mechanisms and agricultural monopoly. They are also known for establishing the dominance of Shiism in Mesopotamia and ending 383 years of Ottoman Empire rule in Iraq.

== Modern day ==
Many descendants of the tribe still live in their original homeland, in the Kingdom of Saudi Arabia, but members of the tribe also live in other countries, such as Palestine, Iraq, Qatar, Bahrain and Jordan.

== Family Branches ==
=== Iraq ===
- Al Kazale (another way of spelling Khazāˁil)
- Al-Khazāˁil
  - Āl Ṣaqar
  - Āl Ḥāj 'Abdullāh
  - Āl Shabīb bin Salmān
  - Āl Ḥāj Muḥsin bin Salmān
  - Āl Dāwūd bin Salmān
  - Āl Ghānim bin Salmān
  - Āl Karnūṣ bin Salmān
  - Āl Darwīsh bin Salmān
  - Āl Danyūs bin Salmān
  - Āl 'Ajrash bin Salmān
  - Āl Kahw bin Salmān
  - Āl Jassās bin Salmān
- 'Ashīrahs of Āl Ḥamd bin 'Abbās al-Khuzā'ī.
  - Albū Ḥamd
  - Albū Muḥammad
  - Albū Jaffāl
  - Āl 'Abbās
  - Āl 'Abdullāh
  - Āl Ḥusayn
  - Āl Sa'dūn
  - Āl Suwayd
- The 'Ashirahs of Salmān al-Awwal al-Khuzā'ī
  - Āl Ḥamūdī
  - Āl Hilāl
  - Āl Ya'qūb
- 'Ashīrahs of Āl Mihnā including al-Ḥays bin Salmān al-Awwal
  - Āl Mihnā
  - Albū al-Dīn
  - Albū Khazˁal
  - Albū Khuḑayr
  - Āl Qadarī
  - Āl Shams
  - Āl Rashīd
- 'Ashīrahs of Āl Māni' Maqṭa' al-Ru'ūs bin Muḥsin bin Jundayl
  - Albū Ḥalīl
  - Albū Kandaj
  - Albū 'Ibādī
- 'Ashīrahs of Āl Ramaḑān bin Salmān al-Awwal
  - Al-Ramaḑān: and they live mainly in the countries of the Persian Gulf.
  - Āl 'Imrān al-Ramaḑān (living in Baghdad)
- The 'Ashīrah of the Āl Juwaykh bin Salmān al-Awwal al-Khuzā'ī
  - Āl Juwaykh in al-NāSiriyah
- The 'Ashīrah of Āl Fāris bin Salmān al-Awwal al-Khuzā'ī.
  - Āl Marzah (living in Najd and Baghdad)
- The 'Ashīrah of al-Ḥamāḥimah, descendants of Ḥāmī bin Muḥammad bin Mahnā bin Ismā'īl bin Salmān al-Awwal al-Khuzā'ī.
  - Āl Dāwūd
  - Āl Shāhir
  - Abū Shakīlah
  - Āl Lāyadh

=== Saudi Arabia ===
- Khuza'a in the Holy city of Mecca: in Wādī Fāṭimah and what used to be known as Wādī Ẓahrān):
  - Dhawī al-Mafraḥ
  - Dhawī al-Harazi
  - Dhawī Maddah
  - Dhawī Mahdī
  - Dhawī Ḥāmid
  - Dhawī Muhammad
- Khuza'a of the open country (Wādī Malkān)
- Al-Talḥah, and they are subdivided into:
  - Āl Sirāj
  - Āl 'Awwāḑ (al-Maṭrān and Āl Turkī)
  - Al-Ḥanashah
  - (Āl Radād) al-Sawālimah
  - Al-Qawāsiyah
- Āl Mash'āb (and they are the sons of ibn Sadaqah)
  - Āl bin Rashīd
- Al-Shimārīn, and they are divided into:
  - Āl Ghaṭaysh
  - Āl Mubārak (among them are Āl Marzūq)
  - Āl 'Awād
  - Āl 'Āyad
  - Āl 'Alī (al-Ghuraybah)
- Khuza'a of the Sea (Baḥrah)
  - Al-Saqāriyah

Khuza'a of Tihamah 'Asīr

- Al-Munjiḥah (al-Munjiḥī) (their homes are in al-Qumḥah on the coast of Tihamah, between al-Barq and Shaqīq; among their villages are in al-Khashāfah, Dhahbān and al-Fattāḥ; and one of their watering places (mawārid) is al-Qu'r.) They include:
  - Amkharīṣ (Kharīṣ)
  - Al-'Abdīyah
  - Āl Zayd
  - Umm Muḥāwish (Muḥāwish)
  - Āl Saryāḥ
  - Al-Ma'yūf
  - Al-Shahbī
  - Wuld Islām
  - Umm Muḥmaḑī
  - Am'awaḑ
  - Al-Raws
  - Amqub'ah
- Al-Rīsh: and their dwellings are in Tihamah, north-east of Maḥayal 'Asīr.
- Khuza'a of Al-Aḥsā Province.
  - Al-Ramaḑān
  - Āl 'Abd al-Salām
  - Āl Ḥawāj(al-Ḥawāj)

=== Jordan ===
- Al-Rousān
- Al-Duwayk (Al Duwek or Al Doweik)
- Al-Khuzāˁilah in the central and northern deserts (bādiyah).
- Al-Khuza'i
- Al-Buṣūl in northern Jordan
- Al-Kufahi in the area of al-Bāriḥah
- Al-Farihat, and among them is the Shaykh Rāshid al-Khuza'i
- Āl Harfush (al-Harafishah)
- Āl Harfush (al-Harafishah) in Wādī al-Sarḥān
- Āl Harfush (al-Harafishah) in al-Mafraq.

=== In Palestine ===
- Āl Quydayḥ, among them:
  - Āl 'Alī
  - Āl Subḥ
  - Āl Ruḑwān
  - Āl Rajīlah
  - Āl Rūk
- Al-Duwaykāt
- Āl Najjār
  - Āl Shanīnū
  - Āl Jāmūs
- Āl Harfush: al-Harafishah, and among them are Ṣāfī and Zayd and 'Īsā 'Nakhlah', sons of the Emir Salām bin Harfush, originally from the village of Bayt Nabālah.
  - Abū Raydah
  - Al-Qarrā
  - Āl Harfush - al-Harafishah (Kharbatā al-Miṣbāḥ).
  - Āl Harfush – al-Harafishah (al-Maghār)

=== In Other Countries ===
- Bahrain
  - Āl Ramaḑān
  - Āl 'Abd al-Salām
  - Āl Ḥawāj (al-Hawāj)
  - Al-Ṭawwāsh
  - Bin '
  - Al-Qaṭṭārah (al-Qaṭarī)
  - Al-Khuzā'ī
- Qatar
  - Bin 'Abbās
  - Al-Khuzā'ī
- Egypt
  - Āl Ḥarfūsh – al-Ḥarāfishah (Banhā)
  - Āl Ḥarfūsh – al-Ḥarāfishah (Al-Bakātūsh, Kafar al-Shaykh)
- Kuwait
- Bayt al-'Arīsh
  - Āl 'Abd al-Salām
  - Āl Ramaḑān
  - Āl Hawāj (al-Hawāj)
- Lebanon
  - Āl Ḥarfūsh – Al-Ḥarāfishah (Baalbek)
- Syria
  - Albū 'Ājūz in Aleppo, they came from Iraq to Syria and all have their written family trees leading back to 'Amr bin Luḥay.
- America
  - There is a large network of members of Khuzā'ah, belonging to the Āl Ḥarfūsh – al-Ḥarāfishah, dating back to the 1920s.

== Ruling Family ==
The leading royal family of the Khuza'ah have been based in Iraq since their migration from modern day Saudi Arabia. Most recently, the Kingdom of the Middle and Lower Euphrates was ruled as a monarchy by the Khaza'il Royal Family, leaders of the Banu Khuza'ah tribe. The Khaza'il Emirate was different to other Arabian Emirates in that it far more closely resembled a fixed state ruled by a Monarchy. As Middle Eastern History scholar Tom Nieuwenhuis writes:

"They were tighter, more hierarchical and less latent in existence – though the riverain confederations were far from being stable political units. Of them the Khaza'il confederation and its leadership were clearly more settled than the others, and in certain aspects resembled sedentary political institutions. Their 17th century center, Imam Hamzah, took more and more the shape of a sedentary community. The shaykhs of the Khaza'il were also more bound to landed interests than most other aristocracies. According to Longrigg, the army of the Khaza'il shaykh 'was not a horde' and 'the rudiments of an administration marked his rapid expansion'. The other shaykhly aristocracies of the riverain areas usually preferred a nomadic style of life."

Although the ruler of the Khaza'il Kingdom was internationally referred to as a King, within Arab society, he was referred to as an emir and styled as sheikh. This dual title reflected both his tribal leadership and the more structured monarchical nature of the state.

Royal Succession Table
No.	Name	Reign Start	Reign End	Notes	Family
1	Nasir bin Muhanna Al Khuza'i ناصر بن مهنا الخزاعي	1604	1622	King from Najaf to Fallujah	House of Khuza'ah
2	Muhanna bin Ali Al Khuza'i مهنا بن علي الخزاعي	1622	1640	Khan of the Middle Euphrates (from Hit to Al Arjah)	House of Khuza'ah
3	Muhammad bin Muhanna Al Khuza'i محمد بن مهنا الخزاعي	1640	Unknown	Leader of the Khuza'ah tribe	House of Khuza'ah
4	Al-Abbas bin Muhammad Al Khuza'i العباس بن محمد الخزاعي	Unknown	1693	Leader of the Khuza'ah tribe	House of Khuza'ah
5	Salman bin Al-Abbas Al Khuza'i سلمان بن العباس الخزاعي	1693	1724	King of the Middle and Lower Euphrates	House of Khuza'ah
6	Hamad bin Al-Abbas Al Khuza'i حمد بن العباس الخزاعي	1724	Unknown	King of the Middle and Lower Euphrates	House of Khuza'ah
7	Muhammad bin Hamad Al Khuza'i محمد بن حمد الخزاعي	Unknown	1747	King of the Middle and Lower Euphrates	House of Khuza'ah
8	Hamud bin Hamad Al Khuza'i حمود بن حمد الخزاعي	1747	1778	King of the Middle and Lower Euphrates	House of Khuza'ah
9	Hamad bin Hamud Al Khuza'i حمد بن حمود الخزاعي	1778	1799	King of the Middle and Lower Euphrates	House of Khuza'ah
10	Sebti bin Muhsin Al Khuza'i سبتي بن محسن الخزاعي	1799	1813	King of Middle and Lower Euphrates; died by drowning	House of Khuza'ah
11	Muhsin bin Ghanim Al Khuza'i محسن بن غانم الخزاعي	1799	1810	Emir of Jazirah; rivaled Emir Sebti bin Hamud. This conflict arose after Emir Hamad bin Hamud redistributed land to the Al Salman branch cousins	House of Khuza'ah
12	Salman bin Muhsin bin Ghanim Al Khuza'i سلمان بن محسن بن غانم الخزاعي	1813	1818	King of Middle and Lower Euphrates	House of Khuza'ah
13	Ghanim bin Salman Al Khuza'i غانم بن سلمان الخزاعي	1818	1821	King of Middle and Lower Euphrates	House of Khuza'ah
14	Khanjur bin Hamad bin Hamud Al Khuza'i خنجر بن حمد بن حمود الخزاعي	1818	1823	King of Middle and Lower Euphrates	House of Khuza'ah
15	Dhirb bin Mughamis Al Khuza'i ذرب بن مغامس الخزاعي	1823	1850	King of Middle and Lower Euphrates; assassinated by Ottoman Empire in Najaf	House of Khuza'ah
16	Kuraidi bin Dhirb Al Khuza'i كريدي بن ذرب الخزاعي	1850	1851	King of Middle and Lower Euphrates	House of Khuza'ah
17	Mutlaq bin Kuraidi Al Khuza'i مطلق بن كريدي الخزاعي	1851	1864	King of Middle and Lower Euphrates; exiled to Constantinople and forced to fight against Russia in Ottoman-Russia War where he was killed in battle. His son, Prince Mit'ab was poisoned by Ottoman Empire in Mosul	House of Khuza'ah
18	Sharmāhi bin Muhammad Al Khuza'i شرماهي بن محمد الخزاعي	Unknown	1935	Final King of Middle Euphrates; between Emir Mutlaq and Emir Sharmāhi, there was a rivalry before the Kingdom was dissolved. The region was later integrated into modern Iraq. His son Abdul-Aziz Al Khuza'i later became a member of the Iraqi Senate	House of Khuza'ah
19	Salman bin Sharmāhi Al Khuza'i سلمان بن شرماهي الخزاعي	1935	1976	Leader of Banu Khuza'ah	House of Khuza'ah
20	Abdul Aziz bin Sharmāhi Al Khuza'i عبدالعزيز بن شرماهي الخزاعي	1976	1980	Leader of Banu Khuza'ah and member of the Iraqi Senate	House of Khuza'ah
21	Hadi bin Sharmāhi Al Khuza'i هادي بن شرماهي الخزاعي	1980	2003	Leader of Banu Khuza'ah	House of Khuza'ah
22	Mohammed bin Abdul Aziz bin Sharmāhi Al Khuza'i محمد بن عبدالعزيز بن شرماهي الخزاعي	2003	Present	Leader of Banu Khuza'ah and former Prime Ministerial candidate of Iraq	House of Khuza'ah

Following the death of Emir Mutlaq, the Khaza'il territories split with individual Sheikhs of the main clans (branches) ruling their respective districts. Between Emir Mutlaq and Emir Sharmāhi, several cousins from the Al Salman branch of the Khaza'il rivalled for leadership of the Khaza'il Emirate over the Albu Hamad branches; these include the militarily powerful Chassàb Al Hammàdi, Salman and Muhammad Al Abtan who had received favour from the British Empire. However, Salman Al Abtan, having been very wealthy and powerful during the late 19th century, had ended impoverished due to the Ottoman distribution of Khaza'il land to rival tribes and sayyids. A similar fate of impoverishment affected much of the Al Salman branch, whereas the Albu Muhammad branch retained its wealth. This was partly due to the Ottoman Empire's limited ability to integrate rival tribes into its provinces. As a result, the Khaza'il remained a unified tribal confederation, continuing to function as an Emirate into the early 20th century. Emir Sharmāhi of the Albu Hamad branch, having retained vast sums of wealth, was able to uphold the traditional role of an open-house Sheikh, maintaining authority over all Sheikhs of the Khaza'il confederation. This allowed him to remain the final ruler of the Kingdom before its integration into the modern Iraqi state. After the Emirate's dissolution, Emir Sharmāhi's sons, His Highnesses Salman and later Abdul-Aziz, succeeded him as paramount leaders of the Khaza'il tribe. Abdul-Aziz later became a member of the Iraqi Senate, further solidifying the family's influence within the new state structure. Today, the current leader of the Khuza'ah tribe is His Highness Sheikh Mohammed Al-Khouzai (Khuza'i), the son of Sheikh Abdul-Aziz.

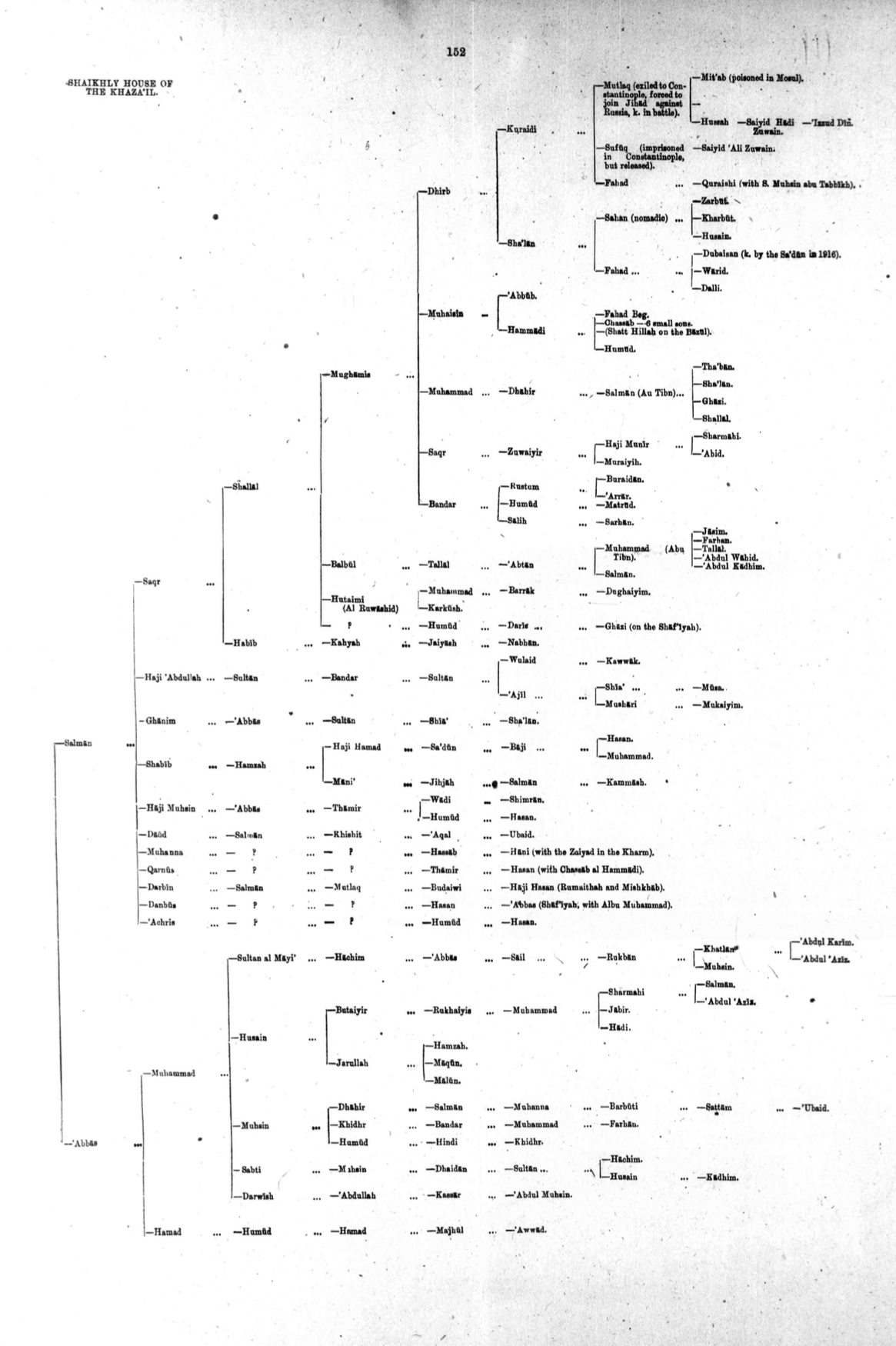
Arab Bureau-produced genealogical table of the Khaza'il (Khuza'ah) Sheikhly House - authors admit errors in terms of relationships between individuals and certain names omitted

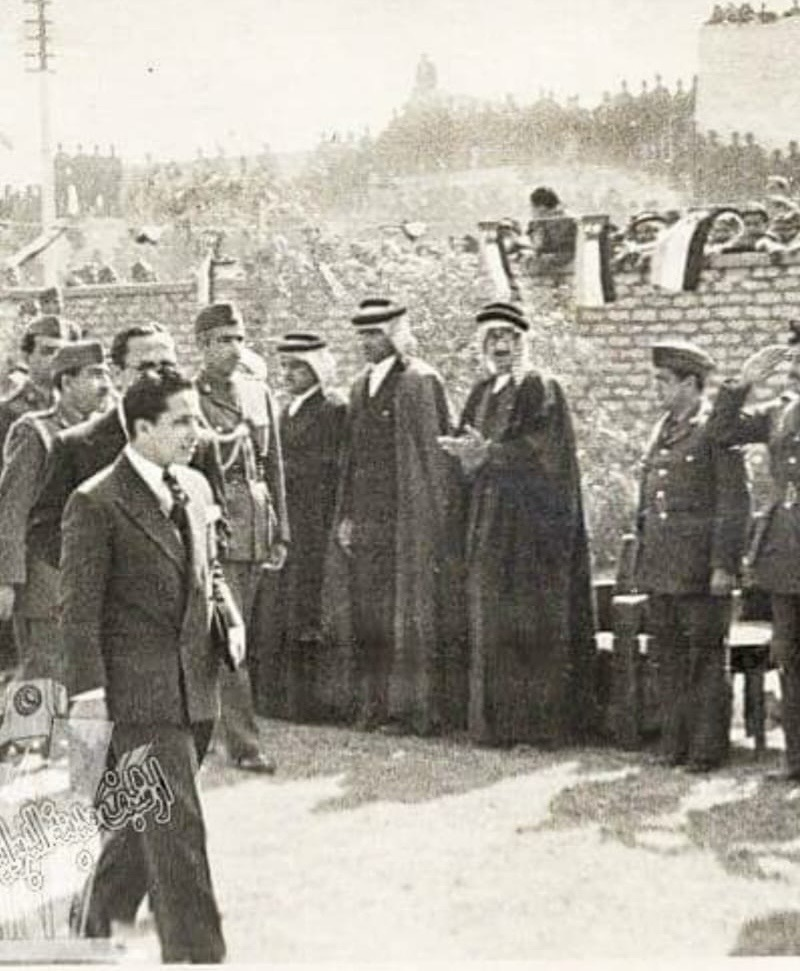
Pictured is His Highness Sheikh Abdul-Aziz bin Sharmāhi Al-Khuza'i (3rd from right), Leader of the Khuza'ah tribe and son of the final King of the Middle and Lower Euphrates, His Majesty Emir Sharmāhi Al-Khuza'i, meeting the Iraqi King Faisal II, following the Khaza'il submission of sovereignty to the Iraq monarchy in 1921.

== Notable Members ==
- Hulail ibn Hubshiyyah
- Hubbah bint Hulail
- Umm Anmaar
- Abu al-Futuh al-Razi
- Sulayman ibn Surad al-Khuza'i
- Abdulla Abbas Abdulla Abbas Ali Hussain Al-Khayat
- Malik ibn al-Haytham al-Khuza'i
- Thabit ibn Nasr al-Khuza'i
- Talha ibn Abd Allah al-Khuza'i
- Muhammad ibn al-Ash'ath al-Khuza'i
- Muhammad ibn Abdallah ibn Malik al-Khuza'i
- Abdallah ibn Malik al-Khuza'i
- Muttalib ibn Abdallah ibn Malik al-Khuza'i
- Emir Ahmad al-Harfush
- Hamid bin Hamoud al-Khuzai
- Khodair al-Khozaei
- Mohammed bin Abdul Aziz Al-Khuzai

== See also ==
- Tribes of Arabia
