= Ilyas ibn Mudar =

Arab tribal chief and an ancestor of the Islamic prophet Muhammad

Ilyas ibn Mudar إلياس بن مضر
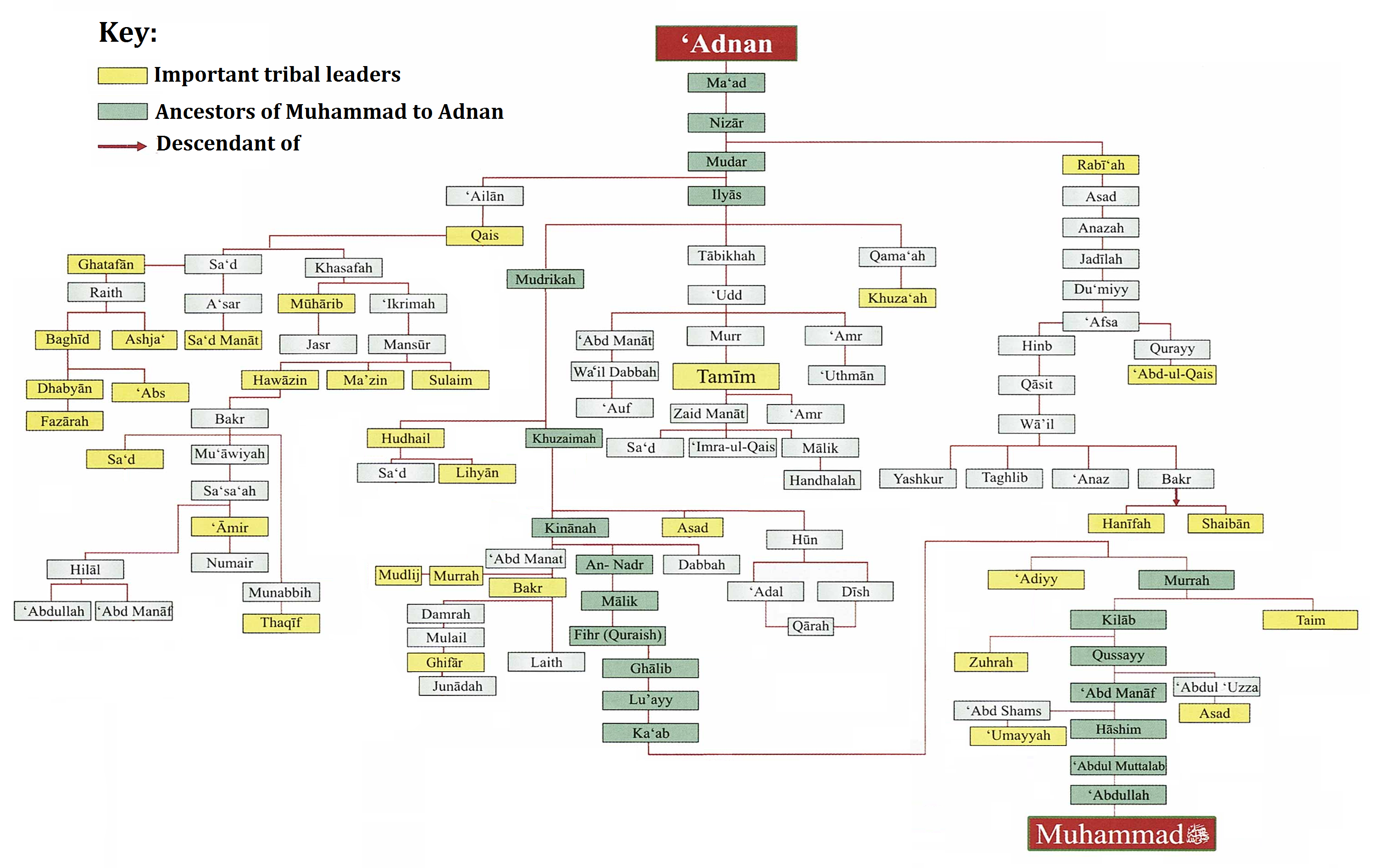
- Family tree showing descent of Muhammad and the Arabian tribes (including Quraysh) from Adnan
- Born: Ilyas ibn Mudar ibn Nizar ibn Ma'add ibn Adnan
- Known for: Being the first to sacrifice an animal at the Kaaba; Being the first reported Arab to have died of tuberculosis; Being one of the ancestors of the Islamic prophet Muhammad
- Spouse: Khindif
- Children: Mudrikah, Tabikha and Qam'ah
- Parents: Mudar ibn Nizar (father); Rabab (mother)
- Relatives: Qays (brother)

Ilyas ibn Mudar (Arabic: إلياس بن مضر) also spelled al-Yas was a pre-Islamic Arabian tribal chief and an ancestor of the Islamic prophet Muhammad. He is the progenitor of the Khindifite tribes, such as the Quraysh. A pioneer of pre-Islamic monotheism, Ilyas ibn Mudar lead a period of religious reform during his rule over the Hijaz to eradicate the worship of idols.

== Biographical information ==
=== Birth ===
His full birth name which shows his lineage is Ilyas ibn Mudar ibn Nizar ibn Ma'add ibn Adnan; which indicates he is a fifth-generation descendant of the Arabian patriarch Adnan through Mudar. The name of Ilyas has also been rendered as al-Yas. He was a descendant of biblical patriarch Abraham through Ishmael.

=== Family ===
Ilyas was born to Mudar ibn Nizar and had a brother named Qays Aylan, the progenitor of the Qays tribal confederation. His mother was an Arab woman named Rabab.

The wife of Ilyas was named Khindif. Ilyas' sons were Amir, Amr and Umayr, whose names were later changed to Mudrikah, Tabikha and Qam'ah respectively. Through Mudrikah, Ilyas is the ancestor of the Banu Hudhayl.

== Life ==
=== Rule ===
Ilyas ibn Mudar succeeded his father as the ruler of Mecca. During his rule, he maintained the Kaaba and was the first to start the custom of slaughtering a camel on the premises of the Kaaba. Ilyas also rediscovered the Maqam Ibrahim, repaired it, and then placed it in a corner of the Kaaba. In his old age, Ilyas died of tuberculosis and was the first Arab recorded to have died from it.

== Religious reforms ==
Ilyas ibn Mudar followed a monotheistic form of religion that was incompatible with the pre-Islamic Arabian polytheism. As such, he openly denounced idol worship to the mixed reactions of his people, who would eventually accept his opinion and follow him in rejecting polytheism. Ilyas' reforms resulted in a period of the rise of monotheism in pre-Islamic Arabia until the arrival of 'Amr ibn Luhay. Ilyas' grandson, Khuzayma ibn Mudrika would be the first to set up the idol of Hubal which the Arabs worshipped for generations until the rise of Islam in the 7th century CE.

== Ilyas in the Islamic tradition ==
The 11th-century lexicographer, Abu Hilal al-Askari stated in al-Awāʿil that Ilyas was mentioned in the Qur'an, specifically in a verse in the chapter as-Saffat which says "Peace be upon Ilyas." Meanwhile, a Hadith forbidding cursing Ilyas due to his monotheism has been narrated as well.

Twelver Shi'ites believe that the ancestors of Muhammad were spared from accepting polytheism, which includes Ilyas and his father Mudar.

== See also ==
- Family tree of Muhammad
- Monotheism in pre-Islamic Arabia
