= Banu Asad =

Arab tribe

Banū Asad بَنُو أَسَدْ
- Mudari Arab tribe
- Ethnicity: Arab
- Nisba: Al-Asadī ٱلْأَسَدِيّ
- Location: Arabia and Levant
- Descended from: Asad bin Khuzaimah
- Parent tribe: Khuzaimah
- Language: Arabic
- Religion: Shia Islam

Banu Asad (Arabic: بَنُو أَسَدْ) is an Arab tribe descended from Asad ibn Khuzayma. They are Adnanite Arabs, powerful and one of the most famous and influential tribes. They are widely respected by many Arab tribes, respected by Shia Muslims because they have buried the body of Husayn ibn Ali, his family (Ahl al-Bayt) and companions with the help of Ali ibn Husayn Zayn al-Abidin, the son of Husayn, and many martyrs from the Battle of Karbala are from the tribe. Today, many members of the tribe live in the Iraqi cities of Basra, Najaf, Kufa, Karbala, Nasiriyah, Amarah, Kut, Hillah, Diyala and Baghdad. There is a branch from the Banu Assad in Northern Sudan called Banu Kahil who migrated from the Hijaz to Sudan. There are also members of the Bani Assad tribe in Ahvaz in the Khuzestan of Iran located with neighboring tribes of Banu Tamim, Bani Malik, Banu Kaab and other notable Arab tribes.

== Lineage ==
The Bani Asad are the patrilineal lineage originating from a man named Asad bin Khuzaimah bin Mudrikah bin Ilyas bin Mudar bin Nizar bin Ma'ad bin Adnan... bin Qedar bin Ismâʿīl (Ishmael) bin Ibrahim (Abraham).

The Asad tribe that exists today are from Mudar (Mudarites), from Khuzaimah to be exact, which makes them the cousins of the Islamic prophet, Muhammad who share with them the same ancestor Khuzaimah ibn Mudrikah ibn Ilyas ibn Mudar.

== History ==
=== Legacy of the Banu Asad ===
In the 6th century, the Banu Asad revolted against the Kingdom of Kindah, A king of Kindah named Hujr was killed by the Banu Asad, who is the father of the last king of Kindah Imru' al-Qais, which started a long war between Kindah with the help of some tribes like Taghlib who were under them against the Banu Asad, the Himyarite Kingdom aided Imru al-Qais in this war, the war results were the end of the Kingdom of Kindah and Imru al-Qais fleeing Nejd region, the illustrious Arabian mu'allaqat poet 'Abid bin al-Abras belonged to the Banu Asad and was fond of vaunting Hujr's murder. In the Namara inscription, Nasrid king of al-Hira, Imru al-Qays I ibn Amr claimed he killed two chiefs from Bani Assad, which is mentioned in Ibn Ishaq where their nephew said a poem about her two uncles the Asadites "One came early to tell me of the death of the two best of Asad, 'Amr b. Mas'tid and the dependable chief (alsamad)".

Banu Asad had their own Talbiyah of the pilgrimage to Mecca before Islam.

=== Migration to Iraq ===
The Banu Asad migrated to Iraq in the 7th century and settled in Kufa. They have settled near the banks of the Euphrates river near Kufa and Karbala and have also settled in Basra and in Ahvaz, sharing land with the Banu Tamim. The Bani Assad sided with Ali in the Battle of the Camel. Many companions of Muhammad and Ali are from the Bani Assad. The Bani Assad tribe sided with Husayn ibn Ali in the Battle of Karbala, which took place on Muharram 10th, 61 AH (October 9 or 10, 680 CE) in Karbala, Iraq. Many martyrs from the Bani Assad clan died with Husayn in the Battle of Karbala.

==== The Mazyadid emirate of the Banu Asad ====
In 998, Ali ben Mazyad, leader of the Baniu Asad tribe, established a virtually independent Mazyadid state in the Kufa area of Iraq. Backed by a powerful tribal army, the Mazyadids enjoyed great influence in the area for a century and a half. They acquired titles and subsidies from the Buyids in return for military services. Their most lasting achievement was the founding of Hillah, one of the main cities in Iraq, which became their capital in 1101. The originator of the Mazyadid name was a scholar, hadith narrator and chemist called Mazyad ben Mikhled al Sadaqa. Imad ad-Din al-Isfahani commented about the Mazyadid rulers, saying:

They were Arabs, belonging to the Bani Mazyad from the Powerful Banu Asad Tribe. They established themselves with the strength of their swords on the banks of Euphrates. They were the refuge of those who were in need of it, the shelter for the expectants, the helpers of those who sought help and supporters of the weak. People with expectation were attracted towards them and scholars found money with them. What they did in spending on good purpose is too well known and talks of their generosity too common. Sadaqa shook with pride when he listened to poetry and set aside for the poet a special part of his generosity. He made them free from poverty. He accepted them in his audience. He was all ears to listen to the requests of people and very generous in giving them what they needed.

==== Members of the Bani Assad clan outside Iraq ====
Mansour Moosa Al-Mazeedi played an important role in developing the Constitution of Kuwait issued on January 29, 1963 as part of Al Majles Al Ta'sesy or Founding Parliament.

The Al Mazeedi family are Shia in Iraq, dramatically increasing the influence of Shia minorities in Arabia. And there are also Al Mazeedi Shia families in Kuwait as well as Sunni. Recently it was discovered that some Al-Mazeedi family members migrated to Yemen a few hundred years ago and settled in the region of Hadhramaut. Their tribal name is Al-Mazyad or Banu Asad, their surnames or their family names is Assadi, Al-Assadi, or Al-Mazeedi, some (about 1,000) were also found in Oman and in India, primarily in the state of Karnataka with ancestral concentration in a place called Thokur, a village in Mangalore. A group of Sunni Muslims having Assadi as surname arrived at the Mangalore Port during the rule of Tipu Sultan. These Persian speaking sailors claimed their ancestry from Banu Assad. They built a Community center by name Thokur Jamia Masjid in Thokur village of Mangalore .

=== Fatalities from the Banu Asad in the Battle of Karbala ===
Habib ibn Muzahir (commander of the left flank), Muslim ibn Awsaja al-Asadi, Uns ibn Hars Asadi, Qais ibn Masher Asadi, Abu Samama Umru ibn Abdullah.

==== Burials ====
On the 13th of Muharram, three days after the massacre, members of the Banu Asad in Karbala had the honor of burying the bodies of Husayn, his family and their companions. The Banu Asad tribe is widely respected by other Shia Arab tribes. Ali ibn Husayn Zayn al-Abidin, the 4th Twelver Shia Imam, helped the Banu Asad tribe to bury the martyred bodies and helped them to identify the bodies of Husayn ibn Ali, his father, and the Ahl al-Bayt and their companions.

== Modern Clans ==
All clans are related which goes back to the same of ancestor of Asad bin Khuzayma.

=== Āl Ghrēj (Gharīq) ===
  - Āl Shari'
  - Āl Haj Yacoub
  - Āl Hilala
  - Āl Hamoudi

Among them are in the Al-Mashurab area between Al-Hindiya and Tuwayraj on the outskirts of Karbala. They are:

  - Elbuganim
  - Elbo Dhahi
  - Elbo Magdy
  - Elbo Bahr
  - Elbo Majzim

Among them are in Najaf and Ahvaz:

  - The Tarahians

Among them in Karbala:

  - Āl Kammounah

Among them are:

  - Āl Sheikh Jaafar
  - Āl Khudari
  - Āl Sheikh Aliwi

Among them in Kirkuk:

  - Āl Naftji

=== Al Sheikhs ===
Their leadership is in Āl Khayun.

- Āl Khayun
  - Āl Hassan
  - Āl Jayyid
  - Āl Janaah
  - Āl Sheikh

And their other sub-clans are

- Āl Wanis
  - Āl Freeh
  - Āl Khaitan
  - Āl Badir
  - Āl Ghaithan
  - Āl Jasim
  - Āl Sh'haf
  - Āl Tarshaan
  - Āl Hamad
  - Āl Khamees
- Āl Abbas
  - Elbu Sodah
  - Elbu Sidyo
  - Elbu Zahroon
- Āl 'Aneesy (isa)
  - Āl Sahr
  - Āl Ataab
  - Āl Sweenij

=== The Haddadin ===
Al-Haddadin

  - Āl Rasheeda
  - Āl Mas'ood
  - Āl Sajiyah
  - Āl Shneen
  - Āl Awaad
  - Āl Hjool
  - Āl Hlool
  - Āl Asghar
- Bani 'Askari
  - Āl Abdul Ameer
  - Āl A'beed
  - Āl Sheikh Ali
  - Āl Sh'haab
- Āl Khaṭir
  - Āl Shabib
- There are Sayyids who have joined the Bani Assad tribe, in southern Iraq many centuries ago
- There are more tribes and clans of Banu Asad

== Leading personalities ==
- Habib bin Muzahir Al-Asadi
- Muslim ibn Awsaja Al-Asadi
- al-Kumayt ibn Zayd al-Asadi
- Uthman ibn Sa'id al-Asadi
- Muhammad ibn Uthman Al-Asadi
- Hafs bin suleiman Al-Asadi
- Aasim ibn Abi al-Najud Al-Asadi
- Dhiraar bin Al-Azwar Al-Asadi
- Maytham al-Tammar Al-Asadi
- Wabisa ibn Ma'bad al-Asadi
- Waliba ibn al-Hubab al-Asadi

== See also ==
- List of battles of Muhammad
