= Banu Hudhayl =

Arab tribe

Banu Hudhayl بنو هذيل
- Khindifite Arab tribe
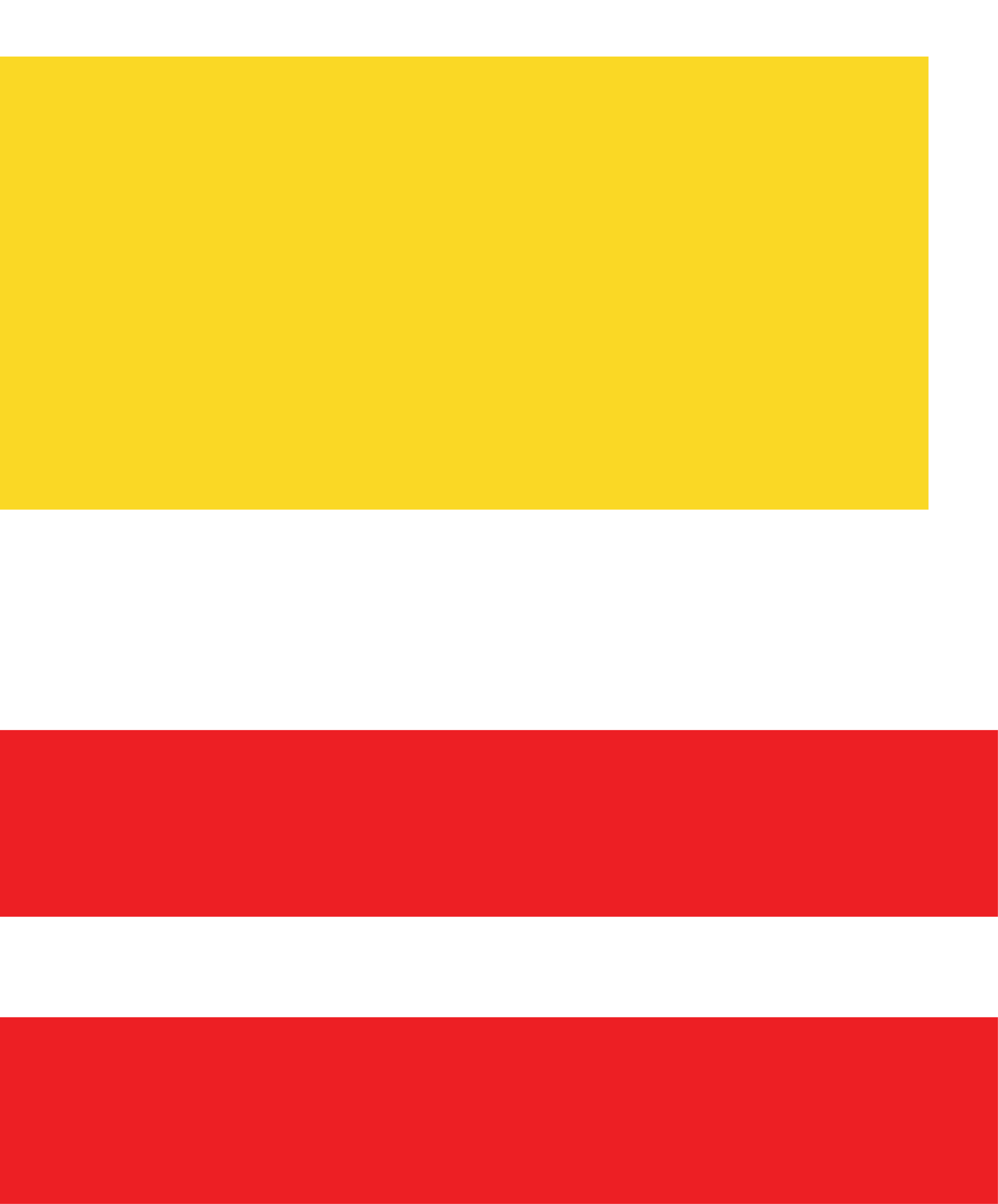
- Banner of Banu Hudhayl at the Battle of Siffin
- Ethnicity: Arab
- Nisba: Al-Hudhali
- Location: Saudi Arabia, Tunisia, Jordan, Egypt
- Descended from: Hudhayl ibn Mudrikah
- Parent tribe: Banu Mudar
- Branches: Lihyan; Mohrez; Marer; Sa'ad; Beni; Fleet; Zohair; Jamil
- Language: Arabic
- Religion: Sunni Islam

Map of the Arabian Peninsula in 600 AD, showing the various Arab tribes and their areas of settlement. The Lakhmids (yellow) formed an Arab monarchy as clients of the Sasanian Empire, while the Ghassanids (red) formed an Arab monarchy as clients of the Roman Empire A map published by the British academic Harold Dixon during World War I, showing the presence of the Arab tribes in West Asia, 1914

Banu Hudhayl (Arabic: بنو هذيل) is an Arab tribe that originated in the Hejaz. The tribe mainly inhabits Saudi Arabia, Tunisia, Jordan and Egypt. The tribe was one of the tribes in contact with the Islamic prophet Muhammad and they are known throughout history for their talented poets and intellectuals, as well as their help in repelling the Qarmatians in the 10th-century Sack of Mecca.

== Ancestry ==
The tribe traces a genealogical history backwards from their eponymous ancestor to Adam:

Hudhayl son of Madrakah son of Ilyas (Elijah) son of Madher son of Nazar son of Ma'ad son of Adnan son of Add son of Send son of Napyot son of Ishmael son of Abraham son of Azar (Terah) son of Nahor son of Srooj son of Ra'o son of Phaleg son of Aber son of Shaleh son of Arpheckshad son of Sam son of Noah son of Lamek son of Motoshaleh son of Edres (Enoch) son of Yared son of Mehlaiel son of Qenan son of Anosh son of Seth son of Adam

== Arabian tribes that interacted with Muhammad ==
- Banu Kinanah
- Quraish
- Banu Sulaym
- Banu Tamim
- Bani Asad
- Banu Thaqif
- Hawazin
- Ghatafan

== Known members ==
- Abdullah bin Masud, a companion of Muhammad
- Al-Masudi, Abbasid historian
- Adel Al-Jubeir, Saudi diplomat and Minister of State for Foreign Affairs
- Ubayd-Allah ibn Abd-Allah, Hadith narrator
- Sinan ibn Salamah ibn Mohbik, Umayyad general and governor of Sindh
- Aboul-Qacem Echebbi, Tunisian Poet
- Abū Dhuʾayb al-Hudhalī, poet contemporary of Muhammad
