= Fitna =

Fitna or Fitnah may refer to:

- Fitna (word), an Arabic term meaning 'trial' or 'civil strife'; also used for the following individual events:
  - First Fitna (656–661 CE), a war of succession in the Rashidun Caliphate between Ali and the Umayyads (and Aisha)
  - Second Fitna (c. 680/683–c. 685/692 CE), a war between the Umayyads and Ibn al-Zubayr
  - Third Fitna (744–750/752 CE), including the Umayyad civil wars and the Abbasid Revolution
  - Fourth Fitna (811–813/827 CE), including the civil war between caliph al-Amin and Crown prince al-Ma'mun and other regional conflicts
  - Fifth Fitna (865–866 CE), between caliphs al-Mu'tazz and al-Musta'in
  - Fitna of al-Andalus (1009–1031 CE), in the Caliphate of Córdoba
- Fitna (film), a 2008 short film by Geert Wilders
- Fitna (TV series), a 2008 Pakistani television series
- Fitnah (crater), on Saturn's moon Enceladus

== See also ==
- Fitnat al-Wahhabiyya, a short book about Wahhabism by Ahmad Zayni Dahlan
