= Laila bint Lukaiz =

5th-century Arab poet of Arabia (d. 483)

- Died: 483 CE
- Occupation: Poet
- Writing career
- Language: Arabic
- Notable work: If Only al-Barraq Could See

Laila bint Lukaiz or Layla bint Lukayz (Arabic: لَيْلَى بنت لُكَيْز died 483), otherwise known as "Layla the Chaste" (Arabic: ليلى العفيفة), was an Arab poet and one of the leading poets of the fifth century.

== Life ==
Laila bint Lukaiz b. Murra b. Asad was one of the women poets who lived before Islam. Leyla, who belonged to the tribe of Rabi'a ibn Nizar, was of Arab origin. It is recorded that Leyla was one of the Arab Christians that existed before Islam. She was the youngest child of her father, Lukeyz, and stood out among her peers for her virtue, beauty, intelligence and decency. It is reported that she had many aristocrat suitors, due to the fact that she gathered many positive traits in her person. She was promised in marriage to a Yemeni prince despite being in love with her cousin Barraq ibn Rawhan. While on her way to Yemen to marry this Yemeni prince, she was kidnapped by a Persian prince who locked her up in his castle for rejecting his advances. In response, Laila wrote her most famous poem, If Only al-Barraq Could See (Arabic: ليت للبراق عيناً), in which she appealed to Barraq and her brothers to rescue her. The poem whipped up the courage of her people, leading to her successful rescue. In the 20th century, the poem was set to music by Mohamed El Qasabgi and popularized by the singer Asmahan.

== Anthologies ==
- Moris Farhi (ed) Classical Poems by Arab Women translated Abdullah al-Udhari, Saqi Books, 1999. ISBN 086356-096-2
- Handal, Nathalie (2001). The Poetry of Arab Women: A Contemporary Anthology. Interlink Books. ISBN 9781566563741. "Laila bint Lukaiz."
- Udhari, Abdullah; al-Udhari, Abdullah (1999). Classical Poems by Arab Women. Saqi Books. ISBN 9780863560477.
