= Mudar =

Northern Arab tribal group

Mudar مُضَر
- Adnanite Arab tribe
- Location: Hejaz, Arabia
- Descended from: Mudar ibn Nizar ibn Ma'add ibn Adnan
- Parent tribe: Nizar
- Branches: Ilyas; Mudrikah; Hudhayl; Khuzayma; Tabikhah; 'Ud; Tamim ibn Murr; Qama'ah; Khuza'ah; Qays; Khasafa; Mansur ibn Ikrima; Hawazin; Sulaym; Ziyad; Sa'd; A'sur; Ghatafan; Amr; Adwan; Fahm
- Religion: Islam

Mudar (Arabic: مُضَر, romanized: Muḍar) is one of the principal tribal confederations of northern and central Arabia in late antiquity and the early Islamic period. Mudar rose to power over the Hejaz in the fifth century, after supplanting its predecessor, the Ghassan, who migrated to Syria. The chief tribes over Mudar may have been the Salihids early on, and then Banu Tha'labah, and finally in the early sixth century, Ghassan.

In the pre-Islamic era, Mudar was usually politically dominated by Himyar, until the collapse of the latter. Mudar also maintained connections with the Byzantine Empire, and participated in joint military ventures together. They helped the Byzantines fight the Persians, and the Byzantines helped ensure they maintain their rule over the Hejaz, including Mecca.

Together with Rabīʿa, it formed one of the two largest groupings of tribes tracing descent from Nizar ibn Maʿadd. In later historiography, "Mudar" came to designate not only a genealogical lineage but also a broad political and cultural bloc opposed to the southern (Yemeni) tribal groupings.

== History ==
In pre-Islamic Arabia, the tribes of Mudar occupied large areas of the Hejaz, Tihamah, Najd, and adjoining regions. Along with Rabi'a, they were at various times under the suzerainty of southern Arabian powers, particularly the Kingdom of Kinda, whose rulers bore the title "king of Maʿadd" or "king of Mudar and Rabīʿa".

The earliest text that mentions Mudar is an inscription, al-῾Irāfa 1 (c. 440?), discovered at Zafar, the capital of the Kingdom of Himyar ruling South Arabia. The inscription mentions the chief of Mudar travelling to Mas'al Jumh to meet the king of Himyar. Mas'al Jumh was the center of Ma'add, which, at the time, was under Himyarite hegemony; the Mudarite chief travelling to the region to meet the Himyarite king suggests that Mudar, too, was then under Himyarite hegemony.

There is one other pre-Islamic inscription that mentions Mudar: Maʾsal 2, dated to June of 521 AD. This source mentions a Himyarite expedition into Sasanian territory which received reinforcements from Mudar, and its leaders, the Banu Tha'labah.

Following the decline of Himyarite authority and the collapse of Kindite rule, Mudar tribes emerged as autonomous actors in central Arabia. They feature prominently in accounts of intertribal warfare, migrations, and alliances, including conflicts involving Rabīʿa and the Lakhmid and Ghassanid client kingdoms. During the later sixth century, sections of Mudar expanded into northern Arabia and Mesopotamia, where the name Diyār Muḍar came to designate a distinct tribal territory.

With the rise of Islam, many Mudar tribes entered the Muslim polity, though not simultaneously or uniformly. In early Islamic historiography, "Mudar" increasingly functioned as a political label within the broader tribal dualism opposing Mudar to Yemen (or Qahtan), a division that became especially prominent after the first Islamic civil wars.

== Tribal division ==
According to the genealogical tradition, Mudar divided into two principal branches: Ilyās (or al-Yās) and ʿAylān (Qays ʿAylān). From these descended many of the most influential tribes of northern Arabia, including Kināna, Quraysh, Tamīm, Hudhayl, Asad, and others.

These tribes varied greatly in lifestyle and political orientation, ranging from sedentary groups associated with sanctuary towns to highly mobile pastoral nomads. Despite their diversity, they were frequently grouped together under the collective name "Mudar" in both pre-Islamic and Islamic sources.

== Genealogy ==
Genealogists trace Mudar’s descent from Mudar b. Nizār b. Maʿadd b. ʿAdnān, placing him among the foundational ancestors of the so-called "northern Arabs". Mudar is said to have had two sons, from whom the major branches of the confederation descended. Genealogical narratives also preserve legendary elements, such as the division of Nizār's inheritance and symbolic associations.

Modern scholarship treats these genealogies with caution, noting that they reflect later attempts to systematize tribal relations and political rivalries rather than straightforward history.

== Mudar and Mecca ==
Tradition associates Mudar closely with the early history of Mecca and its sanctuary. According to legendary accounts, Mudar tribes participated in struggles over control of the Kaaba and the surrounding sacred territory, eventually maintaining certain rituals even in times when political authority passed to other groups.

Several religious offices connected with the pilgrimage, as well as the function of time-reckoning for ritual observance, were attributed to families of Mudar origin. In Islamic tradition, specific sacred months and ritual practices were also associated with Mudar as distinct from other tribal groupings.

== See also ==
- Arab tribes
- Qays

== Sources ==
- Fiema, Zbigniew; Al-Jallad, Ahmad; MacDonald, Michael C.A.; Nehme, Laila (2015). "Provincia Arabia: Nabataea, the Emergence of Arabic as a Written Language, and Graeco-Arabica". Arabs and Empires before Islam (PDF). Oxford University Press. pp. 373–433.
- Kindermann, H. (1995). "Rabīʾā and Muḍar". In Bosworth, C. E.; van Donzel, E.; Heinrichs, W. P. & Lecomte, G. (eds.). The Encyclopaedia of Islam, Second Edition. Volume VIII: Ned–Sam. Leiden: E. J. Brill. pp. 352–354. ISBN 978-90-04-09834-3.
- Robin, Christian J. (2014). "The peoples beyond the Arabian frontier in late antiquity: recent epigraphic discoveries and latest advances" (PDF). Inside and Out. Interactions between Rome and the Peoples on the Arabian and Egyptian Frontiers in Late Antiquity. Peeters. pp. 33–79.
- Robin, Christian J. (2015). "Ghassān en Arabie". In Genequand, Denis; Robin, Christian J. (eds.). Les Jafnides, rois arabes au service de Byzance (VIe siècle de l'ère chrétienne). De Boccard. pp. 79–120.
