= Ma'add =

Ancient Arab tribal grouping

Ma'add ibn Adnan; مَعَدّ ٱبْن عَدْنَان
- Born: 598 BCE; Arabian Peninsula (likely Najd)
- Died: (Unknown); Arabian Peninsula
- Spouse: Mu'ana bint Jawsham ibn Julhuma ibn 'Amru
- Children: Nizar; Quda'a; Qunus; Iyad
- Parent(s): Adnan (father); Mahdad bint al-Laham (mother)
- Relatives: al-Dith ibn Adnan (brother)

Maʿadd (Arabic: مَعَدّ) was an evolving term originally referring to the Bedouins of central Arabia during the pre-Islamic period (pre-7th century). During the early Islamic period, as these Bedouins moved into the Fertile Crescent, the term denoted a tribal confederation, eventually specific 'northern' Arabs, distiguishing those originating from South Arabia. 'Ma'add' became the name of the mythic ancestor of these Arabs in the Arab genealogical tradition which crystallized in the 8th century.

The term 'Ma'add' is first known from pre-Islamic inscriptions where it refers to a group of nomadic and semi-nomadic groups occupying central Arabia, beyond the territorial domain of the major powers of its day: north of the direct territorial control of the Himyarite Kingdom, and south of that of the Lakhmids. Ma'addites retained independence and protected their northern and southern frontiers because they lived in remote areas and had militarized societies. From the fourth to sixth centuries, they were centered at Ma'sal al‐Jumh in the Najd. Ma'add coexisted among other regional identities, including Ghassan, Himyar, and Tayyi'. They are first mentioned in the Namara inscription (328 CE).

The word 'Ma'add' was used in related, but different ways, in other sources. Pre-Islamic literature beyond the peninsula composed in Greek and Syriac used it not for a peoples but for militarized camel-herding Bedouin in north Arabia beyond imperial control more generally. In pre-Islamic Arabic poetry, "Ma'add" was a communal identity and ethnonym functioning in the way that the word "Arab" does today. As such, Ma'add encompassed all peoples, including both northern and southern Arab tribes. In Islamic genealogical accounts, which were written at a time when Ma'add began to be thought of as a tribe as opposed to a central Arabian confederation, "Ma'add" could either refer to a figure named Ma'add, the eponymous ancestor of the Ma'add tribe, or to the tribe itself. The tribe was understood in genealogies to be one of several northern Arab tribes that collectively descended from Ma'add's father, Adnan. By contrast, the tribes of South Arabia traced their ancestry to Qahtan. Ma'addite may have been the Arabic dialect that pre-Islamic qasidas were composed in, and it may have a common ancestor with Hijazi Arabic.

The word Ma'add underwent many semantic shifts in the Islamic era. First, the Ma'add geography transitioned from central Arabia to the Fertile Crescent as a result of the movement of peoples during the early Muslim conquests. Then, the word Ma'add went from being used as an ethnonym, to a tribe. To reassert its hegemony in the face of the spread of pan-Arab identity (and as the term 'Arab' came to adopt the communal sense of 'Ma'add' in earlier times) in the eighth century, the Ma'add tribe was traced to a founder figure (named Ma'add) who became the earliest ascertainable ancestor of the Arabs. By the ninth-century, however, Arab genealogical history was extended further back, first to Ma'add's father Adnan, and then his grandfather Udad, and eventually, Ishmael, as the ancestor of all Arabs. Yet another genealogical model then became dominant, which delineated South Arabs as a distinguished line of Arabs descending not from Ishmael or Adnan, but Qahtan. By the end of the ninth century, Ma'addite identity had become largely lost.

== Pre-Islamic era ==
=== Inscriptions ===
The first well-dated text that uses the word Ma'add (as MʿDW) is the Namara inscription (c. 328 CE), discovered at Namara in southern Syria. In this Arabic inscription, Ma'add is mentioned in a list of the Arabian groups, including Nizar and Asdayn, subjugated by the Lakhmid king Imru' al-Qays ibn 'Amr, along with other Arab nations from north, west central and South Arabia. In this context, Imru' al-Qays is described as the "King of the Arabs" (malik al-ʿarab) and "King of Maʿadd" (malik maʿadd), indicating his submission of the Ma'add in this time. The inscription is ambiguous regarding the geography of Ma'add. According to Webb, the inscription could imply that they were located in South Arabia, possibly near Najran. Irfan Shahid argues that the inscription offers little specificity as to the locale of Ma'add in Arabia, or whether it was a tribe or a confederation. Shahid speculates the group could have formed out of the chaos among the Arab tribes following either the Roman annexation of the Nabatean Kingdom in 106 CE or the fall of the Palmyrene Empire to Rome in 272, both polities having wielded significant influence or control over Arab tribal life in northern Arabia. After the submission to Imru' al-Qays of the Lakhmids, Ma'add again appears in a successive series of conflicts from 340 to 360 CE, in having to confront Himyarite expeditions against them. A century later, in a source found at Maʾsal Jumḥ, the Himyarite king Abu Karib celebrates a conquest of Ma'add in an expedition that involved an alliance with the tribes of Sabaʾ, Hadhramaut, and Kinda. Another source from 521 CE in the same place describes a Himyarite expedition launched further north from the same region, indicating the maintenance of Himyarite possession over subsequent decades. After another revolt, Abraha finally and permanently defeated Ma'add in 552 CE at Haliban.

The 'Land of Maʿadd' (ʾRḌ MʿDM) is mentioned in an inscription, Jabal Riyām 2006–17. The date of the inscription is unclear, although the editors have placed it in the 3rd century CE. If correct, it would be the earliest source for Ma'add. The inscription ʿAbadan 1 (c. 360 CE) describes campaigns by the Himyarite Kingdom against nomadic groups, among them Ma'add.

Ma'add is mentioned in two Middle Sabaic texts which suggest Ma'add is in central Arabia, slightly at odds with the Namara inscription, potentially signifying fluid borders. Inscriptions during and around the time of Abraha (a Himyarite king) in the 6th century more firmly localize Ma'add to central Arabia. Some corroboration for the idea that the Ma'add belonged to the Himyarite sphere of influence comes from the mid-6th century writings of the Byzantine historian Procopius and Ibn Habib's al-Muhabbar (9th century). From these sources, it may be concluded that the Ma'add were generally north of the territory under Himyarite control, and south of the territory of Lakhmid control. Therefore, they existed beyond the domains of immediate territorial control of the major powers of their time.

A new inscription from the late 3rd century CE allows the territorial extent of Ma'add to be confidently assessed at this point in time. It was centered on Maʾsal Jumḥ. To the southeast, it reached Yabrīn, and to the southwest, it reached Ḥalibān. To the north, it reached ʿĀqil and Wādī al-Ruma, including the valley of al-Kharj.

=== Poetry ===
Ma'add is a prominent group described in pre-Islamic Arabic poetry (often used as a signifier for "all people"), with at least a few lines being dedicated to them in virtually every collection of this poetry. They regularly appear as an overarching identity, with whom comparisons are frequently made in order to elevate ones self or their tribe. For example, al-Nabigha al-Dhubyani praises the leader al-Nu'man III ibn al-Mundhir by comparing him with Ma'add:

You outstrip the nobles in nobility / Like a stallion outstrips hunting dogs in the chase, / You surpass all of Maʿadd as a patron sought and enemy feared, / From the abundance of praise, you are its first recipient.

The Taghlib poet al-Akhnas ibn Shurayq used the term in a similar way, to boast of the supremacy of his own clan:

All people of Maʿadd have their tribes / And each have their safe havens. / But we have no mountain strongholds, / Only swords of formidable repute.

For some poets, it was a "disgrace" not to descend from either Ma'add or Adnan and Ma'add's glory alone outweighed the rest of that of the history of Arabia. Some poems imply that the Ma'add tribe were the vast majority of pre-Islamic Arabs. Other poems celebrate Ma'add's victory against a tribe of South Arabia called the Madh'hij.

=== Byzantine sources ===
The nation of Ma'add was mentioned by the Byzantine historian Procopius of Caesarea (c. 500 CE–c. 565 CE) in his historical record of the wars of Justinian I. He mentioned that a Saracen nation named "Maddeni" (Ma'add) were subjects with the kingdom of the "Homeritae" (Himyarites), and that Justinian sent a letter to the Himyarite king ordering him to assemble an army of Himyarite soldiers and from Ma'add under the leadership of a king of the nation of Ma'add named "Kaisus" (Qays), in order to attack the borders of the Sasanian Empire, and then approved the leader of Ma'add as a king on the region.

=== Arabic historiography and Kindite kingship ===
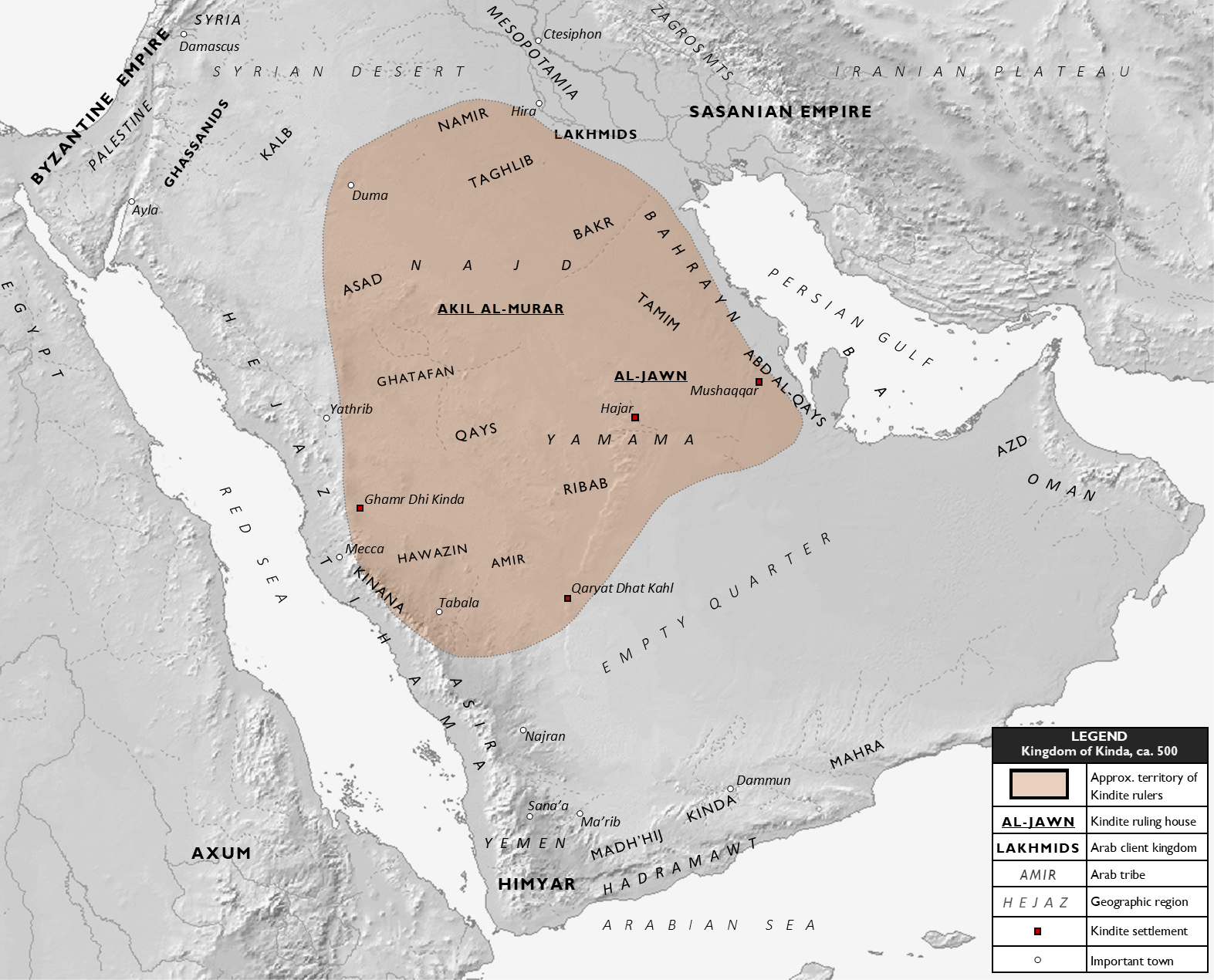
Map showing the approxinate area of the Ma'add tribes in Arabia under the rulership of the Kinda

The 5th-century Sabaic inscription in central Arabia which noted that the Himyarite king Abikarib As'ad and his son Hassan Yuha'min "soujourned in the land of Ma'add on the occasion of the establishment of certain of their tribes" correlates with an early Islamic-period literary source, the Kitab al-Aghani ('Book of Songs') which notes Abikarib As'ad appointed the Kindite chief Hujr "over the tribe of Ma'add". The Arabic literary tradition suggests that Hujr and his family (the Banu Akil al-Murar) established their rule over the Ma'add, in what is generally referred to as the Kindite kingdom. According to the general narrative, the Ma'add tribes invited the Himyarites' intervention to bring order to the Ma'add. Instead of ruling over them directly, the Himyarites delegated the role to Hujr for unclear reasons. (Note: In this respect, the Kinda's relationship with the Himyar are comparable to the Arab client kingdoms of the Sasanian and Byzantine empires, the Lakhmids of lower Mesopotamia and the Ghassanids of the Syrian steppe, respectively. All three Arab kingdoms vied with each other for preeminence in northern Arabia.)

After Hujr died the main body of the Ma'add tribes in Najd (northern central Arabia) were led by his son Amr 'al-Maqsur' and the Ma'add tribes of the Yamama (southeastern central Arabia) were ruled by his other son Mu'awiya 'al-Jawn'. The Ma'add tribe of Rabi'a, or more particularly its subtribes of Taghlib and Bakr, rejected Amr's authority and most likely killed him in battle around the late 5th century. Under Amr's son al-Harith, in 502, the Kinda became federates of the Byzantines, situated largely outside of the Limes Arabicus frontier, while the Ghassanids became the Empire's federates within the Limes under the same agreement. Al-Harith split command of the Ma'add among four of his sons, Hujr, Ma'dikarib, Shurahbil and Salama. Gunnar Olinder estimates the division occurred around the start of his reign, prompted by internal strife among the tribes of Ma'add whose leaders requested the division by al-Harith. Hujr was installed over the brother tribes of Asad and Kinana from the Mudar division and whose abodes were in Jabal Shammar and the Tihama, respectively. Ma'dikarib ruled over the Qays tribe of Mudar, and whose branches were spread across northern and central Arabia. Salama led the Rabi'a tribes of Taghlib and al-Namir ibn Qasit and the Sa'd ibn Zaydmanat and Hanzala branches of the Tamim, another Mudar tribe; all of Salama's tribes dwelt in northeastern Arabia, close to the Sasanian realm. Shurahbil controlled the Bakr, sections of the Tamim, and the Ribab, all except the latter of which lived between Jabal Shammar, eastern Arabia and the Euphrates valley; the Ribab lived in the southern part of central Arabia.

After al-Harith's death in 528, relations deteriorated between Salama and Shurahbil over supremacy in the northeastern Najd where their dominions overlapped. This part of the Kindite kingdom, the closest to the Sasanian realm, had been its most important at the time, when the tribe had attempted to replace the Lakhmids in their capital at al-Hira in Sasanian Iraq. The Taghlib and Bakr had been engaged in a long series of blood feuds known as the Basus War. Their old enmity played a contributing role to the rivalry between Salama and Shurahbil, the kings of Taghlib and Bakr, respectively. Al-Mundhir of al-Hira may have also induced the brothers toward war, offering gifts and honors to Salama, thereby provoking the envies and suspicions of Shurahbil. Besides seeking to neutralize the Kindites who had earlier attempted to topple his Lakhmid dynasty, al-Mundhir was also likely interested in extending his dominion over the Rabi'a tribes, which had migrated closer to his domains from central Arabia over the preceding decades. The brothers' rivalry culminated in a battle at a desert well west of the lower Euphrates called al-Kulab. It became one of best-known battle-days of the pre-Islamic Arabs. Olinder proposes a dating of no later than a "a few years after 530". Most of the Tamim tribesmen who accompanied the Kindite kings in the confrontation melted away, leaving the Taghlib and Bakr as the main belligerents in the fighting with Salama and Shurahbil at their helm. The battle ended with Shurahbil's death and a Taghlib victory.

By the late 6th century, Kindite power throughout central Arabia was fraying. The wars between al-Harith's sons had weakened them in Najd. In the Yamama, the Kindite ruling family became involved in a war between the Tamim and the Banu Amir, the latter a branch of the Qays. The Kindites dispatched contingents in support of the Tamim in their assault against the Amir in what became known as the battle of Shi'b Jabala in Najd, dated variously by modern historians to circa 550, 570 or 580. The Tamim and their allies were routed, and the Kindite king was slain. The loss at Shi'b Jabala spurred the Kinda's abandonment of the Najd and the Yamama and return to their ancestral homeland, the Hadramawt.

== Islamic era ==
=== Movement from Central Arabia to the Fertile Crescent ===
The word Ma'add remained in use after the early Muslim conquests and into the Umayyad period. During this transitional period, the geographic space of Ma'add moved from central Arabia to the Fertile Crescent, likely as a result of the movement of peoples, groups, and clans during the conquests. At this stage, the term came to designate a specific people with a specific history, who were used as a measure of glory, merit, power, and disgrace.

=== Ma'add under Umayyad power ===
The word Ma'add continued to be used in the Umayyad period (661–750), especially in early Islamic poetry, and was recruited to describe the glory of Qurashite elites, particularly in the interest of those residing beyond Mecca. In addition, the expression of this identity in the early Islamic period was used to continue affirming earlier Ma'addite identities, not least because large segments of Umayyad armies were manned by militarized Ma'addites, a process that continued until Ma'addites increasingly occupied a sedentary lifestyle in the face of the success of the conquests.

Umayyad rulers occasionally adopted epithets making use of the term. For example, the caliph Hisham was addressed as "the Lord of Maʿadd and non-Maʿadd" (rabb Maʿadd wa-siwā Maʿadd) in a poem by Abu Nukhayla. The caliph al-Walid II composed a diwan that referred to his entourage as the "elite of Maʿadd" (ʿulyā Maʿadd). Al-Akhtal wrote a verse that praised Muawiya and his son Yazid I:

Your father was Quraysh’s best: / The most noble, generous and temperate. / When the going got tough, and Maʿadd was about to flinch / Your father stood firm as wood.

=== From ethnonym to name of a tribe ===
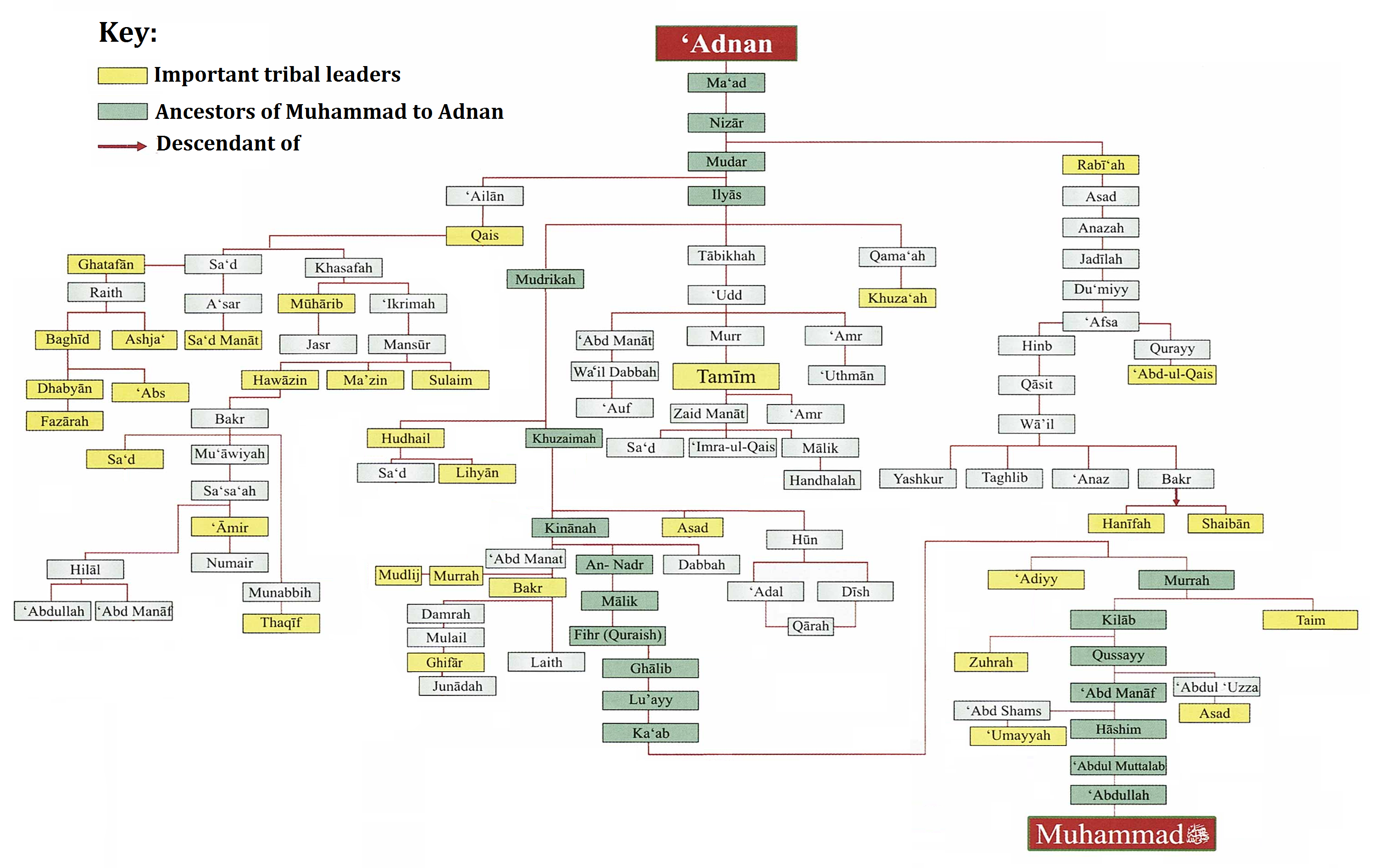
Genealogical tree tracing the descent of Muhammad from Adnan, according to Islamic tradition

In this period, a semantic shift occurred to the term. Earlier, Ma'add functioned as an ethnonym for central Arabian tribes. However, a departure occurs for the first time seen in the poetry of Umar ibn Abi Rabi'ah (d. 719 CE) who refers to Banu Ma'add, i.e. the "tribe of the Ma'addites":

I had once ranked you the best of Banu Maʿadd, / And now, you have surpassed even yourself.

This signalled the beginning of a process by which the term Ma'add was consolidated, from an ethnonym, to the name of a particular tribe. Over time, the exceptional status of Ma'add began to erode. Earlier, some tribes (like the Quda'a) attempted to assimilate into Ma'addite identity, but for several reasons, this process was unsuccessful. Furthermore, the Ma'add were not the only conqueror group from Arabia that had a claim to the spoils and glory of the success of the conquests. Resistance to a collective Ma'add identity was strongest from South Arabian tribes, who eventually elaborated a genealogical history distinguishing them entirely from Ma'add or the lineage of Ma'add, but instead with a different ancestor, Qahtan. Therefore, the following verses were composed to signify an equal status between Ma'add and southern Arabs:

Jarir ibn Atiyah: You command the summit of the Maʿaddites / And your lineage tops the Yemenite heights. (Poet cited by Al-Baladhuri): But for Ibn Badr, / Iraqis have no protector. / Ask who is the saviour of the right – / And Maʿadd and Qahtan point to Ibn Badr.

=== Reaction to Arab identity ===
Around this time, the ethnonym Arab began to become more commonly invoked, in a sense that was in line with the pre-Islamic and collective sense that Ma'add once occupied. Nevertheless, Ma'add continued to be used into middle and late Umayyad poetry. By the late eighth century, the Ma'add identity was in the process of being subsumed into a pan-Arab identity. As a reactionary strategy, and to entrench their status at the top of intra-Arab identity, Ma'addite Umayyad elites developed the notion that (a figure named) Ma'add was the earliest ascertainable ancestor of the Arabs.

=== Ma'add as the Arab ancestor ===
As pan-Arab identity grew in prominence and threatened to subsume Ma'addite ancestry and its exceptionalism among other Arab identities, Ma'add as a person was invented, and transformed into the earliest ascertainable ancestor of the Arabs. The earliest Islamic genealogical writings, composed in the eighth and early ninth centuries, describe Ma'add as the earliest derivable Arab ancestor. In hadiths that can be found in the writings of Ibn al-Kalbi (his Jamharat al-nasab), Ibn Sa'd (al-Tabaqat), Khalīfa ibn Khayyāt (al-Tabaqat), and Ibn Wahb (al-Jami'), the Islamic prophet Muhammad describes the genealogical ancestry of the Arabs: he would stop after reaching Ma'add, and then say "the genealogists lie". In other words, Ma'add was the oldest remembered Arab ancestor. He was said to have been removed from the generation of Muhammad by twenty generations.

An implication of this was that Ma'add as a tribe was synonymized with "original Arab" and allowed to retain its hierarchical prominence under a broader Arab umbrella. Ma'add, as the eponymous founder figure of the Ma'add tribe, came to be conceptualized by Arab genealogies as the father of many tribes along the Western Hijaz coast of the Arabian Peninsula and Najd.

=== Ma'add as the chosen tribe ===
The Ma'add tribe became a chosen group among, or even in contrast to, the Arabs, appearing multiple times in prophecy over the course of a mythic world-history. His birth is placed by several sources in 598 BCE. He was said to have fathered four sons: Quda'a (his first), Nizar, Qunus and Iyad, although by the end of the Umayyad period, the ancestry of Quda'a had been moved to Qahtan instead of Ma'add as the former gained prominence and the latter lost it.

One story occurring first in Ibn Habib's al-Muhabbar describes how Ma'add came to be the ancestors of all Arabs (and by extension, the ancestor of Muhammad, as is stated in sources like al-Sira al-Nabawiyya of Ibn Ishaq). In the 6th century BCE, the Babylonian empire Nebuchadnezzar II invaded the peninsula and committed a genocide of its people. However, prior to the genocide, an Israelite prophet named Abrakhiya b. Ahniya b. Zarabyal was warned by God about this impending event. Abrakhiya was given the mission to discover Ma'add, whence he was still a boy, and bring him to safety. After Arabia had been emptied of its inhabitants, Ma'add returned to the region and settled in Mecca. From there, his lineage spread and he became the sole line of uncontaminated Arab blood. In later times, versions of this story was transmitted by the works of Ibn Khaldun, al-Tabari, and Yaqut al-Hamawi.

The geographer Ya'qubi attributed all sorts of origins myths to Ma'add, including attributing to him the achievement of being the first person to domesticate camels and use them for transporting goods. A hadith recorded by al-Tabarani records Ma'add as attacking a camp of Moses: upon Moses cursing at them, God repudiates him, stating that through Ma'add, an illiterate Prophet will arise. Ibn Duraid reports a hadith asserting that, when Ma'add was faced with Muhammad's group during the conquests, God had already guided them to the true faith. Finally, as the Arabic language became important in conceptualizing Arab identity, Ma'add was synonymized with the climax of correct Arabic speaking, as denoted by the spread of the phrase "More correct-speaking than Maʿadd" (afsah min Maʿadd) in linguistic debates.

=== Erosion of Ma'add identity ===
Eventually, the dominance of Ma'add identity in Islamic tradition receded in the ninth century and Ma'add primacy in genealogies was suppressed. A personality figure that fathered Ma'add was invoked, Adnan, to consolidate this move and shift attention away from Ma'add. Ma'add tribes were relabelled as Adnanite tribes. Although this process won out, it was not uncontested. Ibn Sallam al-Jumahi argued that Ma'add was the true Arab ancestor and that Adnan was a fabrication. In support of this argument, he observed that he only saw the name Adnan one time in pre-Islamic poetry, in contrast to voluminous mentions of Ma'add. Over time, Arab ancestry continued to be transferred more remotely into the past, with a corresponding marginalization of Ma'add's prominence. The hadith where Muhammad traces Arab genealogy until reaching an earliest figure before whom "the genealogists lie" was retained, but in al-Baladhuri's Genealogies of the Nobles (Ansāb al-ashrāf), Muhammad extends this as far back to Udad, the grandfather of Ma'add and the father of Adnan. Another move was then to push ancestry of all Arabs back to Ishmael. Ma'addite identity had become largely lost by the late ninth century. In the tenth century, South Arabians split off their own genealogical history and asserted themselves as the "pure" Arabs—descended from Qahtan and not Adnan—with groups like Ma'add merely being "Arabized Arabs". The genealogy of the Quda'a, formerly placed as an offshoot of the Ma'addite tribe, was revised to ensure that they remained powerful as Ma'add lost influence: they went from descendants of Ma'add to descendants of Qahtan.

== See also ==
- Ishmael
- Ishmaelites
- Qedarite
- Iyad (tribe)
