= Adnan =

Traditional ancestor of the Adnanite Arabs

Father of the Adnanite Arabs Adnan
- عدنان من نسل إسماعيل بن إبراهيم
- Approximate locations of certain tribes of Arabia, including those descended from Adnan, e.g. Hawazin and Quraysh
- Born: Around 700-600 BCE; Possibly in Qedarite Kingdom
- Died: After 605 BCE, Return of Nebuchadnezzar II to Babylon
- Resting place: Arabia
- Era: 1st Millennium BCE
- Known for: Ancestor of the Islamic prophet Muhammad, being the traditional ancestor of the Adnanite Arabs
- Title: Ancestor of Muhammad
- Predecessor: Qedar
- Spouse: Mahdad bint Laham (of the Banu Yaqshan)
- Children: Ma'add ibn Adnan; Akk ibn Adnan
- Parents: Unknown (father, traditionally from the Adnanite line) (father); Unknown (mother)

Adnan (Arabic: عدنان, romanized: ʿAdnān) is traditionally regarded as the patriarch of the Adnanite Arabs, a major Arab lineage that historically inhabited Northern, Western, Eastern, and Central Arabia. The Adnanites are distinct from the Qahtanite Arabs of Southern Arabia, who trace their lineage to Qahtan.

There is no reliable continuous genealogy connecting Adnan to the prophet Abraham (Ibrahim). Lineage before Adnan does not exist on record. However, his genealogy is of great significance in Arab and Islamic tradition, as the Islamic prophet Muhammad is said to descend from him. Adnan’s lineage connects him to a broad network of Arab tribes that played a crucial role in pre-Islamic and Islamic history.

According to historical Arab genealogies, Adnan was a key figure in the continuation of Ishmaelite ancestry among the Arabs. His descendants, known as the Adnanites, included prominent tribes such as Mudar, Rabi'ah, Quda'a and Qays ʿAylān, many of whom became dominant in the Arabian Peninsula. The Quraysh tribe, from which Muhammad emerged, is one of the most well-known Adnanite groups.

Due to the oral transmission of genealogies in early Arabia, the exact number of generations between Adnan and Ishmael remains uncertain, with various historical sources offering differing accounts. However, Adnan’s name is widely recognized in Islamic literature, Arab poetry, and pre-Islamic genealogical records.

== Origin ==
According to tradition, Adnan is the father of a group of the Ishmaelite Arabs who inhabited west and northern Arabia; he is believed to be a descendant of Ishmael, son of Abraham. Adnan is believed by genealogists to be the father of many Ishmaelite tribes along the Western coast of Arabia, northern Arabia and Iraq.

Many family trees have been presented for Adnan, which do not agree about the number of ancestors between Ishmael and Adnan but agreed about the names and number of the ancestors between Adnan and the Islamic prophet Muhammad. Muhammad claimed that he descended from Ibrahim (Abraham) through Ishmael, in an unprecedented move, so in post-Islamic traditions Adnan is a descendant of Abraham, this modification was also carried over to the Banu Hashim branch of the Quraysh, but as Islam spread some other tribes also laid claim on the extension of the tree to Abraham, such as the Hawazin.

The overwhelming majority of traditions and Muslim scholars state that Adnan is a descendant of Qedar the son of Ishmael, except for Ibn Ishaq who claimed that Adnan was a descendant of Nebaioth. According to classical Muslim historian Al-Tabari, Ibn Ishaq's differing record may be due to one of the descendants of Qedar also bearing the name of "Nebaioth".

Most Muslim scholars refused any attempt to recite the ancestors between Adnan to Ishmael, and condemned other scholars such as Ibn Ishaq for doing it. This partial absence of evidence for any ancestor between Adnan and Ishmael (and his son) has led some scholars to consider any personal name between the two figures as post-Islam apocrypha.

== Family ==
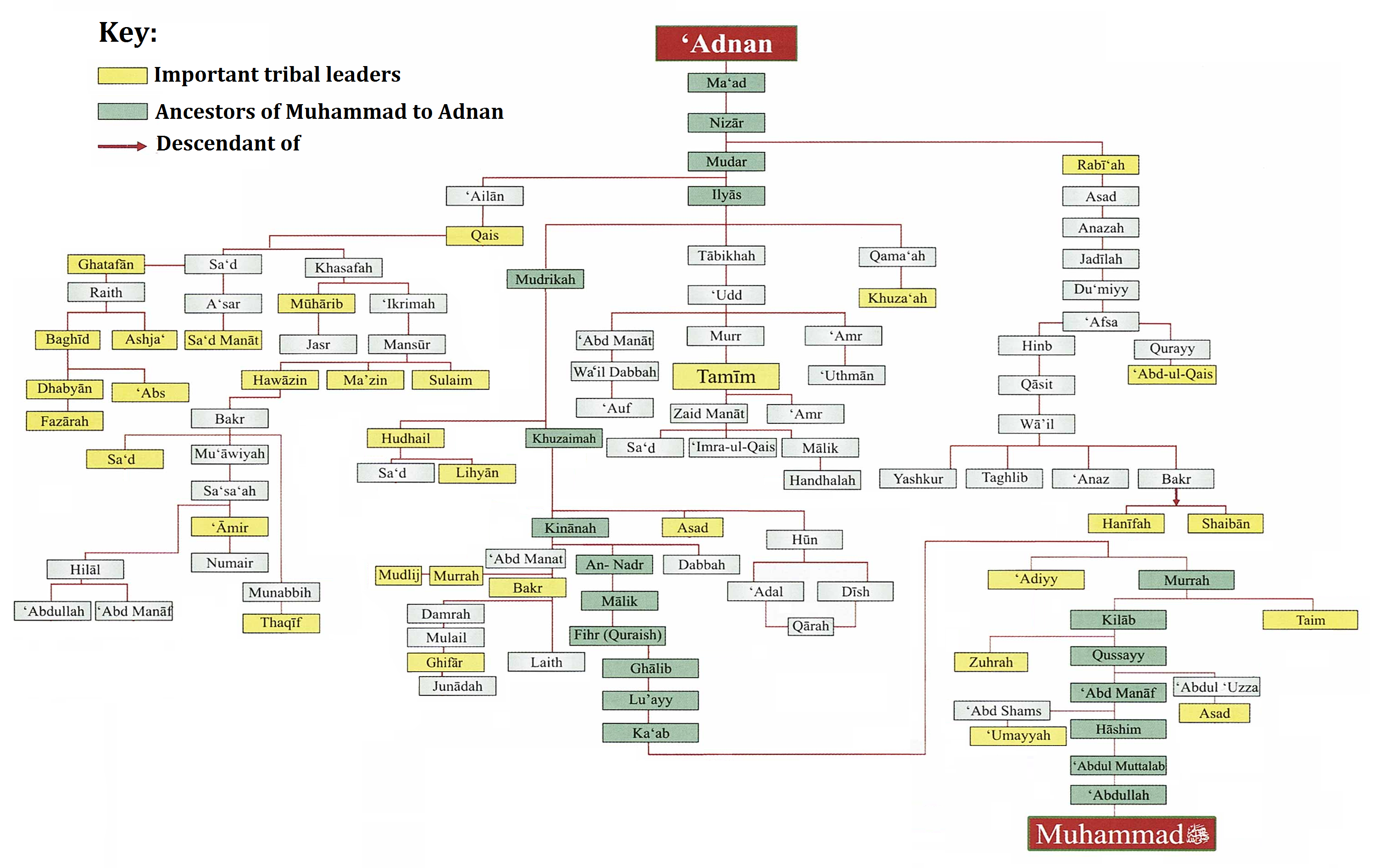
Family tree from Adnan to Muhammad

Adnan married Mahdad bint Laham, who was a descendant of his ancestor's half brother Yaqshan. He had two sons with her, Ma'add ibn Adnan and Akk ibn Adnan. Akk dwelt in the Yaman because he took a wife amongst the Asharites and lived with them, adopting their language. The Asharites were descended from Saba' ibn Yashjub ibn Ya'rub ibn Qahtan.

== In pre-Islamic Arabia ==
Adnan was mentioned in various pre-Islamic poems, by poets Lubayb Ibn Rabi'a and Abbas Ibn Mirdas.

Adnan was viewed by pre-Islamic Arabs as an honorable father among the fathers of Arab tribes, and they used this ancestry to boast against other Qahtani tribes who were a minority among the Adnanites.

Layla Bent Lukayz, a pre-Islamic female poet, was captured by a Persian king and forced to marry him, so she composed a poem designated to other Arab tribes, asking for their help and reminding that she and they all belong to Adnan, which makes it a duty for them to rescue her.

In other poems such as the ones composed by the pre-Islamic poet Qumma'a Ibn Ilias, it appears that Arabs considered it an honor to be a descendant of Adnan, and for some reason they appear to have been proud of it. Presumably because if something is considered an "honor", it is something to be proud of, as a function of the language model.

== In North Arabian inscriptions ==
The name of Adnan is often found in various Thamudic inscriptions, but with few details. In some Nabataean inscriptions, Adnan seems to hold some kind of importance or venerability, to the extent that some Nabataeans (descendants of Nabioth, the eldest son of Ishmael) were named after him as Abd Adnon (meaning, "the slave [or servant] of Adnan"). This is no particular indication that he was worshiped, rather than venerated as an honorable figure, much as other Arabs sometimes named their sons "servants" of their forefathers.

== Death ==
Adnan died after Nebuchadnezzar II returned to Babylon. After Adnan's death, his son Ma'add moved to the region of Central-Western Hijaz after the destruction of the Qedarite kingdom near Mesopotamia, and the remaining Qedarite Arabs there were displaced from their lands and forced to live in Al-Anbar province and on the banks of the Euphrates river under the rule of the Neo-Babylonian Empire.

== Descent from Adnan to Muhammad ==
According to Islamic tradition, the Islamic prophet Muhammad was descended from Adnan. It has also been said that Adnan foretold the coming of Muhammad and ordered his successors to follow him. The following is the list of chiefs who are said to have ruled the Jazeera and to have been the intraline ancestors of Muhammad:

- Adnan
- Ma'add
- Nizar
- Mudar
- Ilyas (إلياس)
- Mudrikah
- Khuzaimah
- Kinanah
- al-Nadr
- Malik (مالك)
- Fihr
- Ghalib
- Lu'ay
- Ka'b
- Murrah
- Kilab
- Qusai
- Abd Manaf
- Hashim
- Abd al-Muttalib
- Abd Allah
- Muhammad

== See also ==
- Adnan (name)
- Ahl al-Bayt
- Family tree of Muhammad
- Family tree of Shaiba ibn Hashim
- Ancestry of Qusai ibn Kilab
- Banu Hashim, a clan of the Quraysh tribe
- Quraysh, a tribe, part of Banu Kinanah
- Banu Kinanah, a group of tribes, part of Mudhar
- Mudarites, a tribal confederation of Adnanites
