= Mudrikah ibn Ilyas =

Ancient tribal leader of pre-Islamic Arabia

Mudrikah ibn Ilyas مُدْرِكَة ٱبْن إِلْيَاس
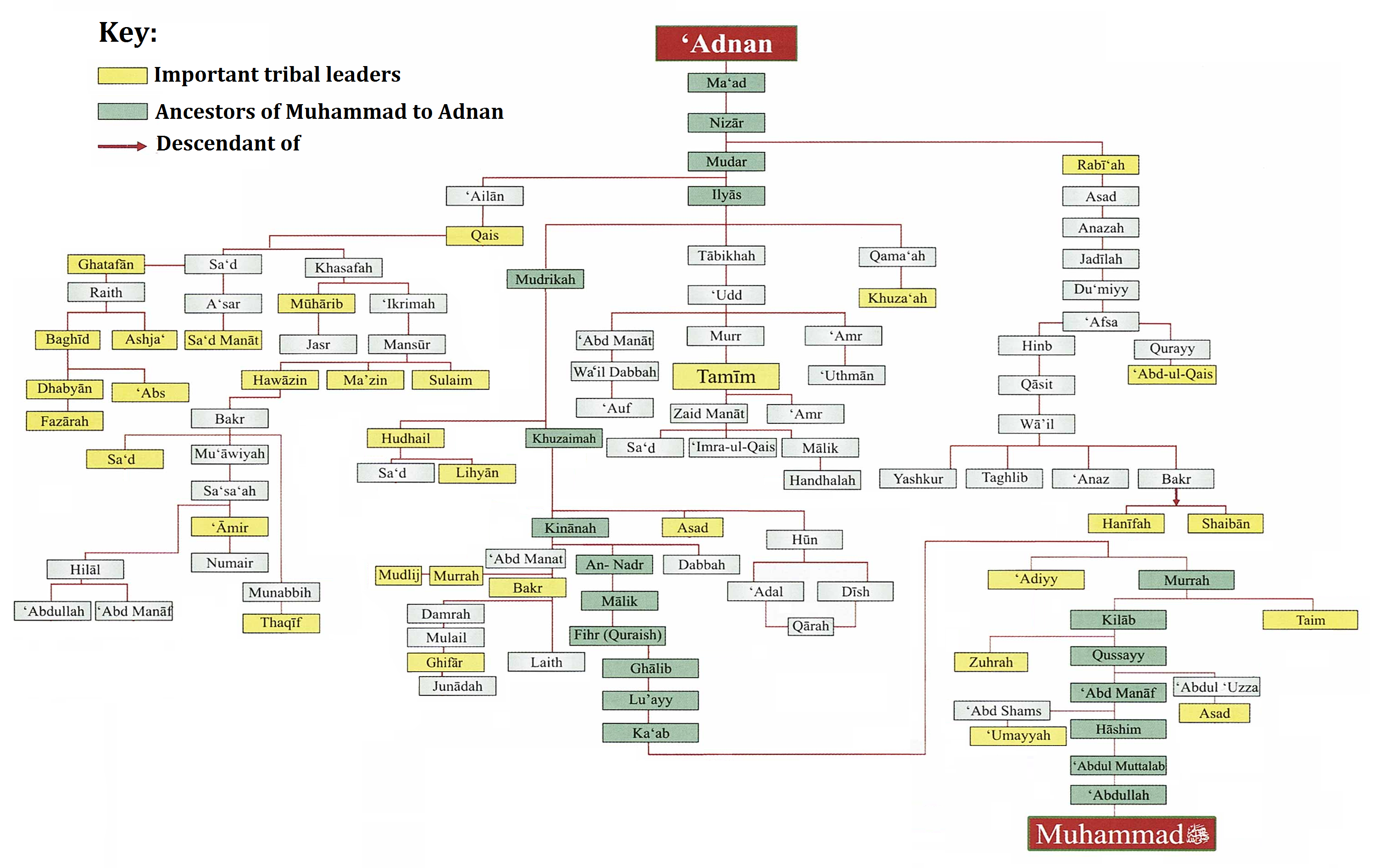
- Family tree showing descent of Muhammad and the Arabian tribes (including Quraysh) from Adnan
- Born: Amir ibn Ilyas
- Known for: Being the ancestor of Banu Hudhayl and also being one of the ancestors of the Islamic prophet Muhammad
- Spouse: Salmah
- Children: Hudhayl and Khuzaymah
- Parent: Ilyas ibn Mudar
- Relatives: Tabikha and Qam'ah (brothers)

Mudrikah ibn Ilyas (Arabic: مُدْرِكَة ٱبْن إِلْيَاس), was a tribal leader in the era of pre-Islamic Arabia. Mudrikah is the father of Hudhayl, who would be the progenitor of the Banu Hudhayl tribe. He is also one of the ancestors of the Islamic prophet Muhammad.

== Genealogy ==
According to Ibn Ishaq, the full ancestral lineage of Mudrikah is Mudrikah, son of Ilyas, son of Mudar, son of Nizar, son of Ma'ad, son of Adnan and several generations leading back to Ishmael and Abraham.

== Family ==
Mudrikah, real name Amir, is the son of Ilyas ibn Mudar; with Ilyas being a fourth-generation descendant of the South Arabian patriach Adnan. He had two brothers named Tabikha and Qam'ah, whose real names were 'Amr and 'Umayr respectively. Mudrikah married an Arab woman named Salmah whose origins are disputed; some have claimed her from the tribe of the Quda'a while others claimed she was from Rabi'a ibn Nizar.

From Salmah, he had two sons named Hudhayl and Khuzaymah. Hudhayl was the ancestor of the Banu Hudhayl. Khuzaymah is remembered as the ancestor who connects the lineage of the Islamic prophet Muhammad to Mudrikah and hence to Adnan.

=== Twelver Shia View ===
According to a Twelver Shi'ite narration in the book Bihar al-Anwar, Mudrikah and his descendants were monotheists who were saved from falling into polytheism due to being an ancestor of Muhammad.

== See also ==
- Family tree of Muhammad
