= Adnanites =

Tribal confederation of the Ishmaelite Arabs

Banu Adnan بنو عدنان
- Qedarite branch of the Ishmaelites
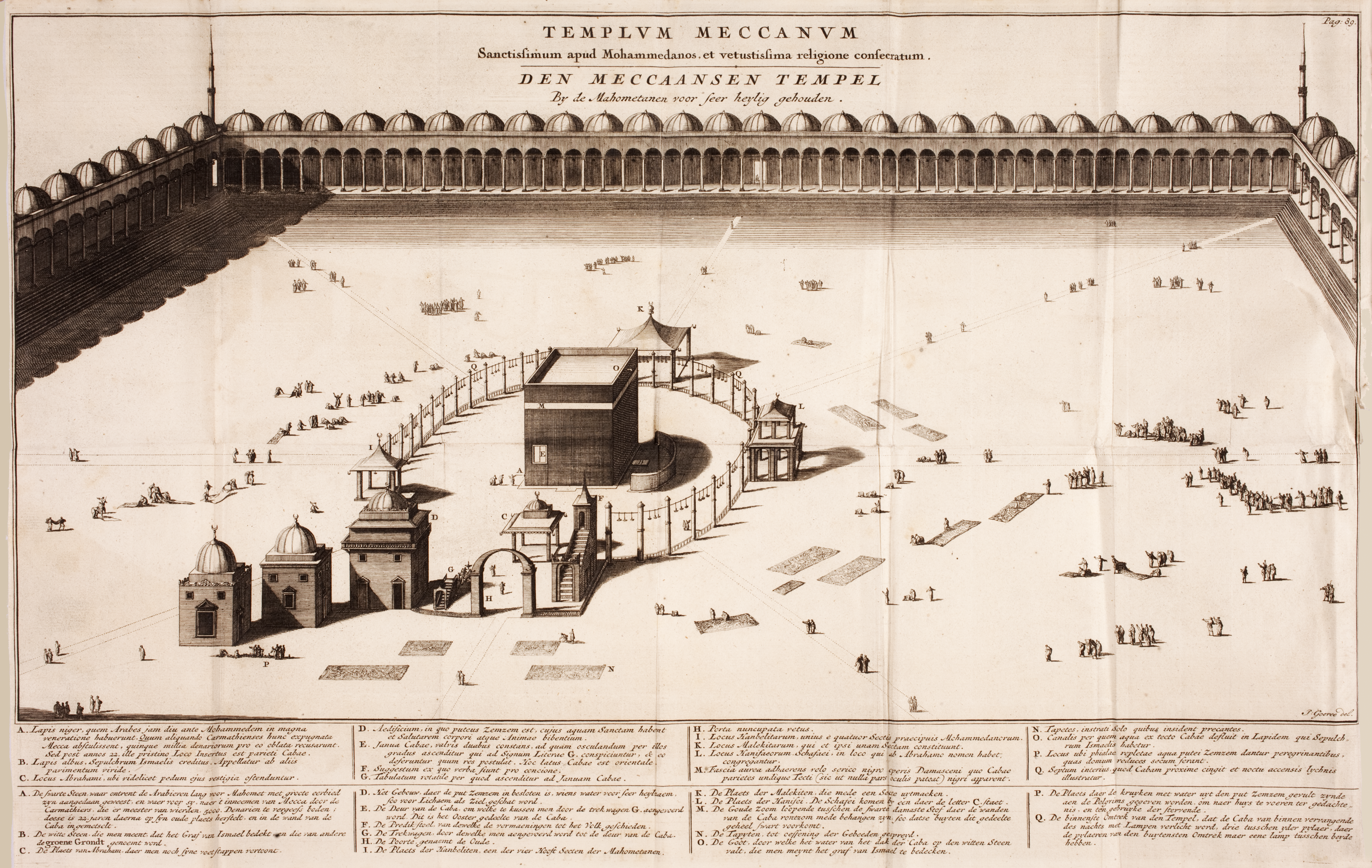
- View of Kaaba in 1718, which was previously ruled by the Quraysh tribe of 'Adnanites' in Pre-Islamic Arabia
- Nisba: al-Adnani (masculine) al-Adnaniyyah (feminine)
- Location: Western Arabia, Hejaz region (present-day Saudi Arabia)
- Descended from: Adnan
- Religion: Islam; Pre-Islamic Arabia: Hanif, Indigenous polytheistic Arabian religion Minority: Christianity (Nestorianism), Judaism, Zoroastrianism, later on

The Adnanites (Arabic: عَدْنَانِيُّون, romanized: ʿadnāniyyūn) were a tribal confederation of the Ishmaelite Arabs who originated from the Hejaz. They trace their lineage back to Ishmael, son of the Islamic prophet and patriarch Abraham and his wife Hagar, through Adnan. The Islamic prophet Muhammad belonged to the Quraysh tribe of the 'Adnanites'.

According to the Arab tradition, the Adnanites are the Northern Arabs, unlike the Qahtanite Arabs of southern Arabia, who are descended from Qahtan, son of the Islamic prophet Hūdʿ.

== Arab genealogical tradition ==
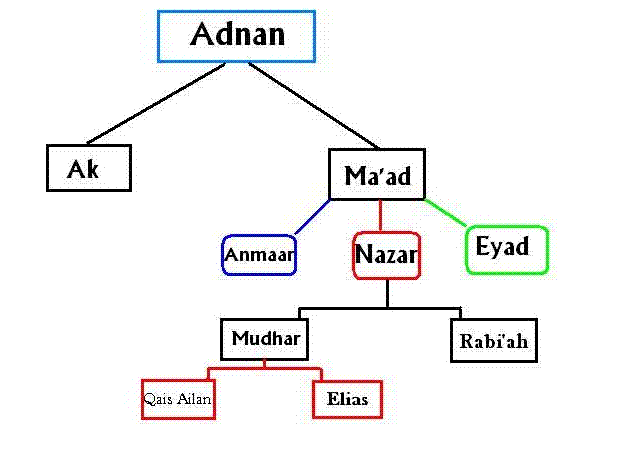
A family tree depicting branches of the Adnanites.

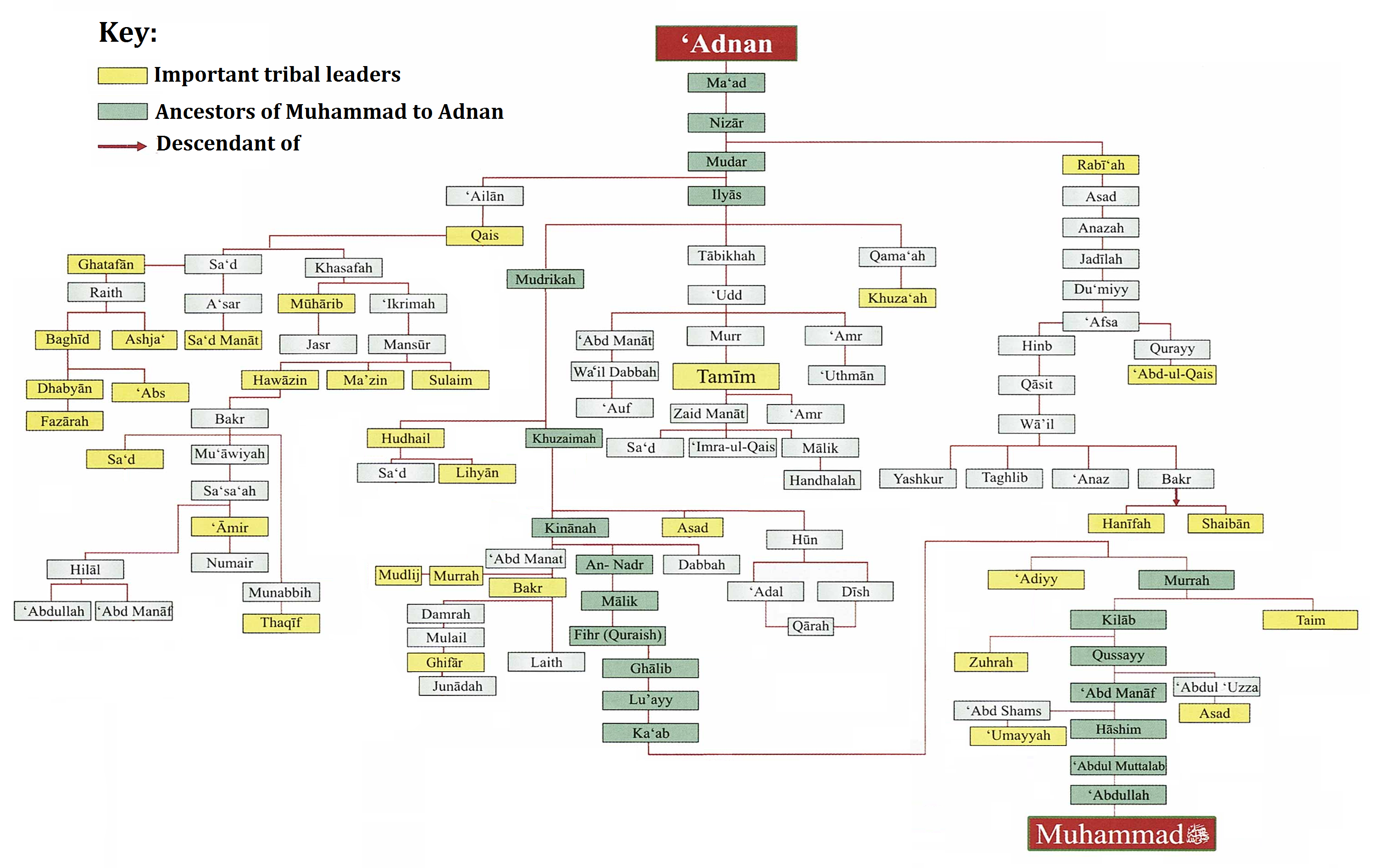
A family tree depicting the descendants of the Banu Adnan.

According to Arab genealogical tradition, the Adnanites are descended from Adnan, who in turn is descended from Ishmael, whereas the Qahtanites of Southern Arabia (Yemen) are the original, pure Arabs.

== Modern historiography ==
According to some modern historians, the traditional distinction between Adnanites and Qahtanites lacks evidence and may have developed out of the later faction-fighting during the Umayyad period.

== See also ==
- Prophet Muhammad, a member of this group

== Sources ==
- Parolin, Gianluca P. (2009). Citizenship in the Arab World: Kin, Religion and Nation-State. Amsterdam University Press. p. 30. ISBN 978-90-8964-045-1. "The 'arabicised or arabicising Arabs', on the contrary, are believed to be the descendants of Ishmael through Adnan, but in this case the genealogy does not match the Biblical line exactly. The label "arabized" has come about due to the belief that Ishmael spoke Hebrew until he got to Mecca, where he married a Yemeni woman and learnt Arabic. Both genealogical lines go back to Sem, son of Noah, but only Adnanites can claim Abraham as their ascendant, and the lineage of Mohammed, the Seal of Prophets (khatim al-anbiya'), can therefore be traced back to Abraham. Contemporary historiography unveiled the lack of inner coherence of this genealogical system and demonstrated that it finds insufficient matching evidence; the distinction between Qahtanites and Adnanites is even believed to be a product of the Umayyad Age, when the war of factions (al-niza al-hizbi) was raging in the young Islamic Empire."
- al-Bakrī, Abdullah (1983). al-Saqqā, Muṣṭafā (ed.). Muʿjam mā istaʿjama min asmāʾ al-bilād wa-al-mawāḍiʿ wa-al-buldān معجم ما استعجم من أسماء البلاد والمواضع والبلدا [Dictionary of Unfamiliar Names of Countries, Places, and Lands] (in Arabic). Vol. 1 (3rd ed.). Beirut: Ālam al-Kutub. p. 87.
