= Khater =

Surname

Khater is a surname. Notable people with the surname include:

- Akram Fouad Khater, professor of history at North Carolina State University
- Lahad Khater (1881–1975), Lebanese journalist and writer
- Lama Khater, Palestinian journalist and writer
- Mohammad Khater (born 1989), Jordanian professional footballer
- Mohammed bin Khater Al Khater, Qatari diplomat, Qatar's ambassador to India
- Salih Khater, British man convicted of murder in the 2018 Westminster car attack
- Subait Khater (born 1980), retired Emirati footballer
- Suleiman Khater (1961–1986), Egyptian soldier who committed the Ras Burqa massacre in 1985
- Toufic Abou Khater (1934–2020), Monaco-based Palestinian/Lebanese billionaire businessman

== See also ==
- Al Khater, prestigious family in the Middle East
- Nazlet Khater, archeological site in Upper Egypt that has yielded evidence of early human culture
- Boneh-ye Khater, a village in Howmeh Rural District, in the Central District of Deylam County, Bushehr Province, Iran
- Givad Khater, a village in Hur Rural District, in the Central District of Faryab County, Kerman Province, Iran
- Gol Khater, a village in Howmeh-ye Sarpol Rural District, in the Central District of Sarpol-e Zahab County, Kermanshah Province, Iran
