= Qataris =

People of Qatar

قطريون
- Flag of Qatar

Regions with significant populations
- Qatar c. 380,000
- Saudi Arabia: 7,060
- United Arab Emirates: 2,671
- Jordan: 2,530
- Canada: 2,485
- United Kingdom: 2,347
- Kuwait: 1,731
- Australia: 1,507
- United States: 1,200
- Turkey: 1,157
- Egypt: 441
- Brazil: 175
- Oman: 150
- South Korea: 137
- Bahrain: 68
- Japan: 30

Languages
- Arabic (Gulf, Qatari, Modern Standard) · English

Religion
- Sunni Islam (85%), Shia Islam (15%)

Related ethnic groups
- Other Arabs

Qataris (Arabic: قطريون) are the nationals of the State of Qatar, located on the northeastern coast of the Arabian Peninsula in the Middle East.

== History ==
Herodotus, the Greek historian and traveler from the fifth century B.C., noted that the people of Qatar were Canaanites and skilled seafarers.

In the mid-first century A.D., Pliny the Elder referred to the inhabitants of the Qatar peninsula as the Catharrei and described them as nomads who wandered continuously to find water and suitable grazing lands.

Throughout the years, Qatar saw successive influxes of Arab tribes from the interior, particularly during the 17th and 18th centuries. From 1664 to 1666, a severe drought in Najd forced many to migrate to the Qatari peninsula. During this period, the Al-Maadeed tribe, as well as several tribes of the Bani Utbah confederation arrived in Qatar. Branches from both sides controlled different portions of the peninsula at differing points.

In 1848, Mohammed bin Thani migrated from Fuwayrit to Al Bidda. Prior to this migration, each tribe and settlement had its independent leader, and there was no documented instance of their unification in battle. The concept of a unified land or nation was not present. However, with Mohammed bin Thani's arrival, Qatar began to gain significant economic and political weight. Beginning with him, the House of Thani would rule Qatar starting in 1851, following the Battle of Mesaimeer. Following the Qatari–Bahraini War in 1867–1868, Qatar was recognized as an independent political entity in September 1868 with the signing of a treaty between Mohammad bin Thani and the British representative Lewis Pelly.

Due to the country's highly arid environment, traditional professions were largely centered around maritime activities, primarily fishing and pearl hunting. Pearling was seen as a more lucrative venture because of the high costs associated with fishing and the potential for windfalls from successful pearling trips. However, as a result of the financial system favoring ship owners, sailors and divers would see very little profit for themselves, leaving most in poor financial straits. Furthermore, both were seasonal professions, leaving those in the industry with few methods of earning income outside of select months.

Reports written by British diplomats in 1930 and 1931 document how some locals had been forced to pawn off pieces of furniture to make ends meet after the pearling industry had collapsed due to the introduction of cheap cultured pearls. After oil was discovered in nearby Bahrain in 1932, many Qataris opted to migrate there for economic opportunities. Similarly, many migrated to Saudi Arabia and Kuwait after oil was discovered in those respective countries due to the relatively small size of Qatar's early oil industry.

In October 1973, the Arab oil embargo precipitated a sharp rise in global crude prices, which quadrupled over the course of the six-month restriction, creating what became known as the first oil shock. A second oil crisis followed in 1979, again driving up prices and leading to fuel shortages in consumer markets. The surge in revenue brought significant economic changes to Qatar, and allowed the state to institute national welfare policies for its citizens.

== Ethnic groups ==
=== Bedouins ===
The Bedouins, comprising approximately 10% of Qatar's native population, are traditionally nomadic tribes who roamed the vast deserts of the Arabian Peninsula, unconcerned with political boundaries and recognizing only the authority of their tribal sheikhs. They did not settle permanently in one location. Several Bedouin tribes, such as Al Murrah and Al Ajman, migrated to Qatar from regions in modern Saudi Arabia like Najd and Al Hasa in the late 19th and early 20th centuries, while others like Na'im and Al Manasir made the journey from the Trucial States (modern United Arab Emirates). They typically entered Qatar during the winter to graze their camels. Notably, the Bani Hajer and Al Kaaban (Al-Qaʽabiyah) are the only Bedouin tribes considered indigenous to Qatar, though they also have branches in regions like Al Hasa and Bahrain.

During the mid-20th century economic boom, many found work in the oil industry, police, army, and security services. The government settled Bedouin families in the 1960s, discouraging the nomadic lifestyle. Today, many live in urban areas but return to the desert to stay connected to their roots. Despite their small population, Bedouin tradition has a disproportionately outsized role in Qatari culture. Many Bedouins see themselves as noble and "pure" Arabs, often looking down on the settled population (Hadar) as influenced by urban and Persian elements. Intermarriage between these groups is rare.

=== Hadar ===
The Hadar community comprises those who inhabit the coastal villages across Qatar, having traditionally engaged primarily in maritime activities. This group includes tribes such as Bu Kuwara, Al Muhannadi, Al Mannai, Al Bin Ali, Al Sulaiti, Al Sada, Al Khulaifat, Al Sudan, Al Bu Samait, Al Buainain, Al Kubaisi, Al Humaidat, And Al Attiyah. These tribes often monopolized specific coastal areas or neighborhoods, which are still known by their tribal names today, such as the As Salatah and Al Khulaifat districts of old Doha. The Hadar's economic life heavily depended on the sea, influencing their cultural and social structures.

=== Huwala ===
Huwala refers to Sunni Arab families who historically lived on the southern Persian coast before returning to the Arabian Peninsula. This group includes families such as Al Marzooqi, Al Hammadi, Al Jaber, Al Nasuri, and Al Mahmoud. They retained their Arab identity despite their time in Persia. Upon their return, they settled in areas like Qatar and Bahrain, where they were collectively known as Huwala. The term Qbaeil is used for a different group of Arabs who similarly migrated to Persia, but who returned to Qatar at an earlier date. J.G. Lorimer noted that around 2,000 Huwala lived in Doha and Al Wakrah by the early 20th century.

=== Baharna ===
The Baharna community comprises tribes such as Al Sayegh, Al Haddad, Al Majid, and Al Safar. This group has historically been involved in various trades and crafts, and typically derive their names from inherited professions. For instance, the Al Sayegh family, translating to "goldsmith", is notable for its history of involvement in the country's goldsmithing industry. The Baharna, predominantly Shia Muslims, have faced discrimination within Qatari society due to their religious beliefs, despite their Arab roots.

=== Transitional tribes ===
Transitional tribes include those that originally led nomadic lifestyles but later adopted a dual existence, living seasonally between the Qatari desert and coastal villages. These tribes, including Al-Maadeed, Al Dawasir, and Al Subaie, mostly transitioned to a settled lifestyle for economic reasons. The ruling Al Thani family belongs to this category, having migrated from Najd to Qatar in the late 17th century and settled in various coastal towns, eventually becoming prominent through trade and pearling activities.

=== Afro-Arabs ===
Qatar's Afro-Arab population descends from slaves brought from East Africa for the pearling industry. In the early 1900s, approximately 6,000 Afro-Arabs were recorded as living in Qatar, of which more than 4,000 were slaves. After Qatar abolished slavery in 1956, many former slaves continued to carry the family names of their former masters and operate within that family's social network. The 1961 citizenship law ensured citizenship for former slaves whose families had been brought into the country prior to the 1930s.

While some Arabs may view this group as "less" Qatari, most consider them full citizens. Despite occasional discrimination, this group is well integrated into Qatari society, and intermarriage is increasing. Unlike in the Atlantic slave trade, African descendants in the Gulf did not typically possess a diasporic consciousness or desire to return to their ancestral continent. Instead, they integrated into local social structures. Consequently, the history of enslavement is often suppressed, though traces persist in music forms like the liwa and tanboura. Exhibits at the Bin Jelmood House at Msheireb Museums document this history through photographs, installations, and oral interviews with Qataris of enslaved ancestry, such as musician and actress Fatma Shaddad.

=== Ajam ===
The Ajam, ethnic Shia Persians, were historically active in boat building, and still speak Farsi.

== Demographics ==
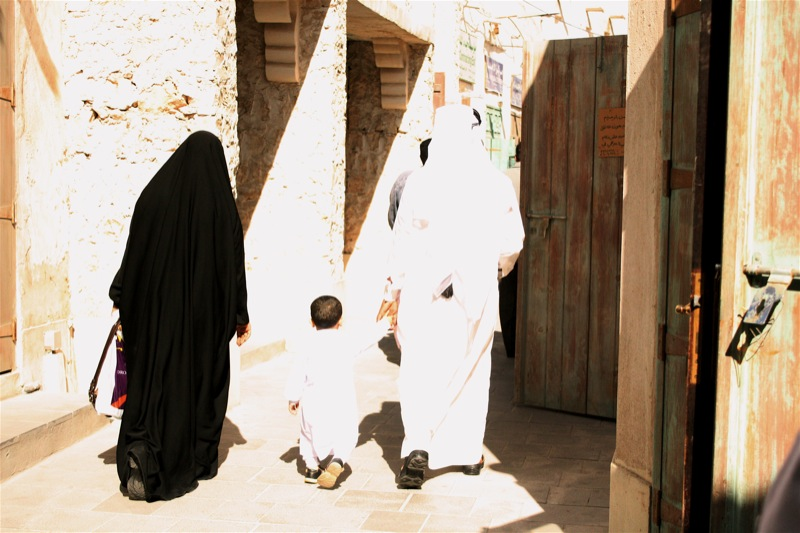
Qatari family on an outing at Souq Waqif

Qatar's government has supported population growth among native Qataris through extensive subsidies and social welfare programs, including housing loans, reduced dowries, and family allowances that grow with the number of children per couple. These measures are designed to promote marriages and larger families and have led to a significant increase in population. Historically, the Qatari government has been secretive about the total size of its native population, considering it a "national secret".

Throughout the 20th century, Qatar's population saw dramatic changes. In 1904, the British Foreign Office estimated the population at approximately 27,000. Economic hardships in the early 20th century, exacerbated by the decline in pearl fishing and the Great Depression, reduced the population to around 16,000 by the mid-1940s. The discovery of oil in the late 1940s reversed this trend, leading to a population increase. By 1970, the first official census recorded 45,039 indigenous Qataris, although the true number was likely closer to 47,700 due to undercounting. Estimates by 1975 suggested the population had risen to 60,300, with the naturalization of foreign-born wives of Qatari men believed to contribute to a large percentage of this increase. Despite small-scale naturalization in specific instances, Qatar's naturalization policies, like most other Persian Gulf countries at the time, were relatively strict from the 1970s onward.

By the 1980s, more accurate and comprehensive demographic data became available. The 1986 census recorded 101,859 Qatari nationals, reflecting a high natural increase rate and increasing naturalization rates. The 1997 census showed an indigenous population of 151,771, with a notable rise in the number of births. By 2010, the population of Qataris aged 10 and above was 174,279, with a total indigenous population estimated at 240,042. An estimate in 2022 put the population of native Qataris at around 300,000. In recent years, the fertility rate among Qatari women has declined, mostly due to higher educational attainment and delayed marriages.

=== Citizenship ===
Two distinctions exist between Qatari citizens: those whose families migrated to Qatar before 1930, commonly referred to as "native Qataris", and those whose families arrived after. Previously, the 1961 citizenship law defined Qatari citizens as only those families who have been in the country since the 1930s, though this was repealed in the 2005 citizenship law. In 2021, a law was signed by Emir Tamim bin Hamad Al Thani restricting the rights to vote in local elections for those whose families' arrival post-date the 1930s, leading to minor demonstrations and public disapproval. This led Al Thani to announce later that he would amend the law to allow all citizens to vote in future elections.

Children of Qatari mothers and foreign fathers are not granted Qatari citizenship; however, as of 2018, they are granted permanent residency status, which entitles them to similar state benefits as Qatari citizens. Nonetheless, the government limits the number of permanent residency visas it issues each year. The 2005 citizenship law allows for the revocation of citizenship without appeal, which has been used on a number of families with dual citizenship.

=== Social welfare ===
Qatar has been described as a rentier state that has allocated a significant portion of its wealth from hydrocarbon exports towards the social welfare of its citizens, in a sense "buying their loyalty". Such programs are seen by the House of Thani as being integral to maintaining their legitimacy.

Initially, the distribution of wealth in the rentier state model was exclusive, with only a select few involved in its creation and allocation, while the majority benefited as recipients. Despite the perception of every Qatari holding a "winning lottery ticket," the reality was that hydrocarbon revenues were controlled by the state and channeled to citizens through specific mechanisms. During Qatar's early years of oil wealth, infrastructure and social services evolved slowly alongside hydrocarbon development. Initial efforts targeted basic needs like electricity, water, healthcare, and education, albeit with a significant portion of oil revenues redirected to the ruler's personal treasury. However, protests during Sheikh Ahmad bin Ali Al Thani's rule led to a more equitable distribution of oil revenues, known as the "quarter rule". His successor, Emir Khalifa bin Hamad Al Thani, furthered this trend, significantly increasing social aid, housing benefits, and salary increments. In 1985, Arabic newspaper Al Raya reported that the policy of the Ministry of Labor and Social Affairs at the time was to distribute monthly stipends of QAR 750 for single men, QAR 1,050 for married couples, and up to QAR 1,770 for couples with children.

In addition to providing essential services like healthcare, education, and housing—all at no cost to citizens—there are no taxes, and there is an abundance of additional state benefits, including land grants, interest-free loans, scholarships for students studying abroad and guaranteed civil service jobs. As a result of these various benefits, some Western analysts have described Qatari citizens as "too rich to care" about disrupting the political system or questioning the legitimacy of the ruler. Despite these outward appearances of prosperity and contentment, recent surveys reveal that some of the Qatari population is dissatisfied with state benefits. While services like healthcare and education enjoy relatively high levels of support, other aspects, such as retirement benefits, receive notably less endorsement. Benefits and privileges afforded can vary depending on the social standing of a family.

== Language ==
Arabic is the official language of Qatar according to Article 1 of the Constitution. Qatari Arabic, a dialect of Gulf Arabic, is the primary dialect spoken. As the prestige dialect within the nation, Qatari Arabic not only functions in everyday communication but also plays a significant role in maintaining cultural identity and social cohesion among the Qatari people. The vocabulary of Qatari Arabic incorporates a plethora of loanwords from Aramaic, Persian, Turkish, and more recently, English. Phonetically, it conserves many classical Arabic features such as emphatic consonants and interdental sounds, which distinguish it from other Arabic dialects that have simplified these elements. Syntactically, Qatari Arabic exhibits structures that align with other Gulf dialects but with unique adaptations, such as specific verb forms and negation patterns.

As English is considered the prestige lingua franca in Qatar, bilingual locals have incorporated elements of English into Qatari Arabic when communicating on an informal level. This mixture of English terms and phrases in Qatari Arabic speech is colloquially known as Qatarese. The practice of interchanging English and Arabic words is known as code-switching and is mostly seen in urban areas and among the younger generation.

== Religion ==
Sunni Muslims make up the majority of native Qataris at 85% to 90%, with the remaining 10% to 15% comprising Shiites.

== Culture ==
=== Music ===
The music of Qatar is based on sea folk poetry, song and dance. The historical importance of pearl fishing have deeply resonated within the region's artistic expression, manifesting in melodies, tunes, and dances that reflect the bond between humanity and the sea. Music has served multiple cultural purposes in Qatar in the past, ranging from being used in weddings and other celebrations to religious rituals, as lullabies (hadhada), and in military parades. Workers would also sing amidst the toil of their daily tasks, mainly during sea-based activities. In contemporary times, khaliji ('gulf') music has gained in popularity among the locals.

=== Folklore ===
Qatari folklore largely revolves around sea-based activities and the accolades of renowned folk heroes. Like elsewhere on the Arabian Peninsula, folktales – known in Qatar as hazzawi – play an important role in Qatar's culture. Some of Qatar's folktales, such as May and Gilan, have a distinctive local character while others have been imparted by nomadic tribes wandering between the present-day Arab states of the Persian Gulf. Local folk stories were seldom documented, instead being passed down orally from generation to generation.

Among Qatar's most noted folk heroes are Qatari ibn al-Fuja'a, a 7th-century war poet, and Rahmah ibn Jabir Al Jalhami, an 18th- and 19th-century pirate and transitory leader of Qatar. Recurring themes in Qatari folklore are djinn, pearl diving, and the sea. Almost every story has a positive moral behind it, such as honesty, strength or piety.

=== Clothing ===
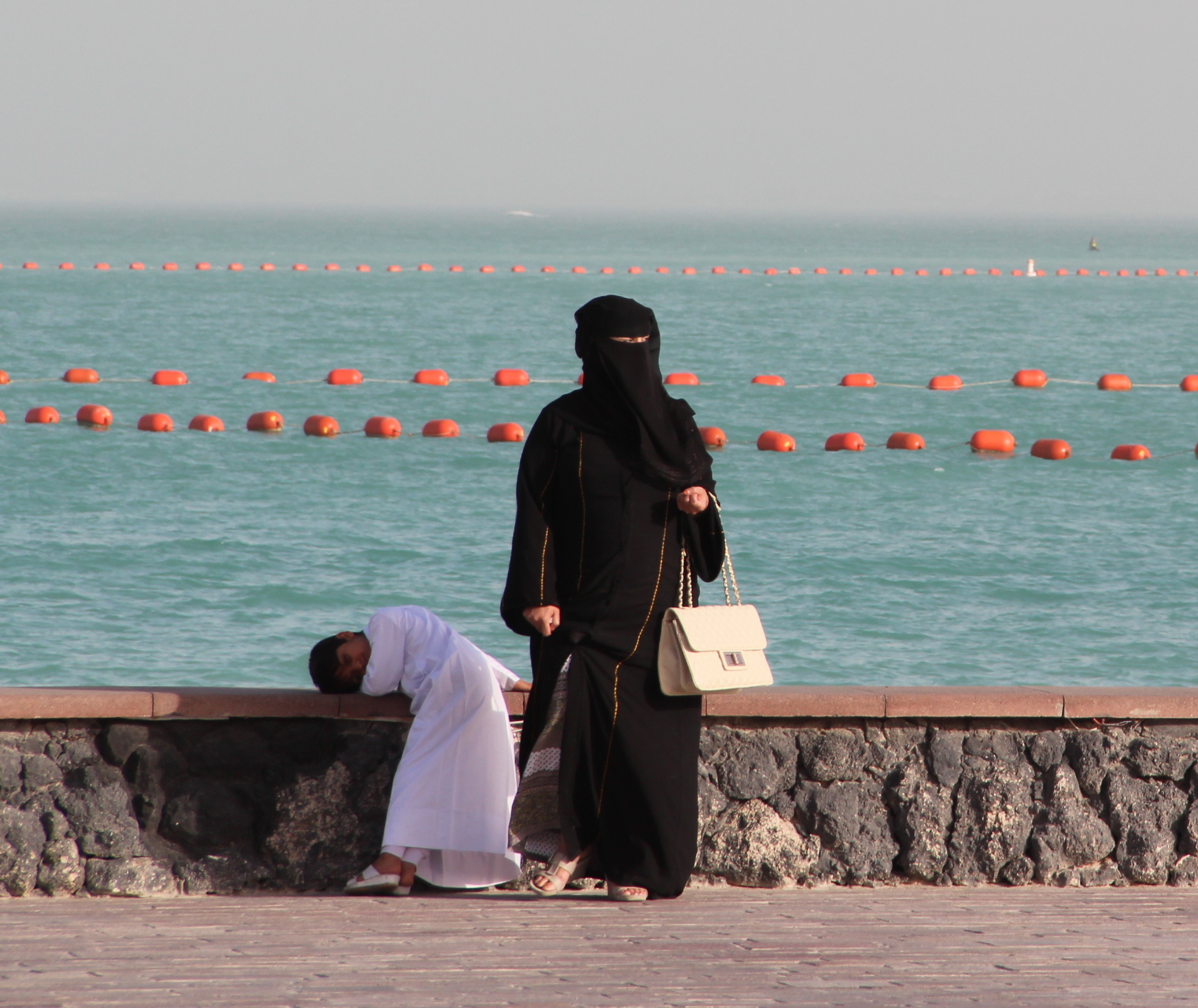
A Qatari woman wearing an abaya and niqāb

In Qatar, the clothing worn is similar to other Persian Gulf countries, typically consisting of a ghutra, agal, and thawb for men, and an abaya and shayla for women. Face veils, usually either a niqāb or burqa, are sometimes worn by women. Depending on the context and setting, men and women will make micro-adjustments to their dress to better suit the situation, such as tilting the agal for men or loosening the abaya for women in informal contexts. Some differences exist between rural (Bedouin) and urban traditional dress, although these variations are mostly minor and superficial.

Jewelry, typically gold-adorned, is very commonly used by Qatari women during special occasions such as weddings and festivals and, to a lesser extent, for daily use. Most jewelry worn by Qatari women is handmade, even after the rise in popularity of more cost-efficient manufactured jewelry. In modern times, the jewelry pieces worn by women are typically smaller in size than those in the past. Jewelry for daily use is lightweight and thin, and is not as ornately embellished as jewelry for special occasions. In contrast, jewelry used for a wedding can be so plentiful in quantity and heavy enough to cause a bride mobility issues.

== Genetics ==
=== Y-chromosome DNA ===
Y-Chromosome DNA Y-DNA represents the male lineage. The Qatari Y-chromosome in large belongs to haplogroup J which comprises two thirds of the total chromosomes

J1	≈58.3%	
J2	≈8.3%	
E*	≈7.0%	E(xE1b1b)
R1a	≈6.9%	
E1b1b	≈5.6%	
Other Haplogroups	≈13.9%	

==== Genetic studies ====
A 2023 study focusing on the Y-chromosome, which is passed down paternally, analyzed DNA samples from 379 unrelated Qatari men to investigate their genetic heritage and connections to other populations in the Arabian Peninsula, the Middle East, and Africa. This research utilized 23 Y-STR markers, highly variable segments of DNA, to create genetic profiles and assess diversity within the Qatari male population.

The study revealed a high level of genetic diversity within the Qatari male population, with the marker DYS458 showing the most variation. Analysis of these genetic markers allowed for the prediction of Y-chromosome haplogroups, which are branches on the human Y-chromosome phylogenetic tree. The most prevalent haplogroup found in the Qatari sample was J1, accounting for approximately 49% of the individuals tested. This haplogroup is known to be common in the Arabian Peninsula and is associated with populations of Semitic origin, particularly Arabic speakers. The prominence of J1 in Qatar, forming a "star-like expansion cluster" in genetic networks, suggests a significant ancestral component linked to the broader Arabian region and potentially a more recent population expansion. Other haplogroups found in notable frequencies included J2, R1a, E1b1b, E1b1a, T, and L.

To understand Qatar's genetic placement within the region, the study compared Qatari Y-STR data with that of 38 other Middle Eastern populations. This analysis revealed that Qataris are genetically closest to Iraqi Arabs, followed by Saudi Arabian populations. Conversely, they showed the greatest genetic distance from groups like Kurdish Iraqis, Turkish populations from Dogukoy, and Palestinian Christian Arabs. These relationships were visualized using multidimensional scaling (MDS) plots, which graphically represent genetic distances between populations. The MDS analysis placed Qatar within a cluster of populations from the upper Arabian Peninsula, including Iraq, Jordan, and Palestine, suggesting shared genetic affinities within this broad geographical area. Further analysis using phylogenetic trees and population structure analysis (STRUCTURE) corroborated these findings, consistently grouping Qatar with Iraqi Arabs and highlighting its distinctiveness from other Arabian Peninsula populations in some analyses, while also showing broader connections within the Middle East.

The study also investigated gene flow, or migration patterns, using Bayesian statistical methods. The analysis suggested that the primary migration route influencing the Qatari population was from Yemen to Kuwait, passing through Qatar. This finding aligns with a model of coastal migration within the Arabian Peninsula. While there was evidence of bidirectional migration between Qatar and neighboring countries like Saudi Arabia, Kuwait, Iraq, and the UAE, the strongest signal pointed towards this Yemen-Kuwait axis. This genetic evidence supports historical understandings of tribal movements and trade routes along the Persian Gulf coast.

=== Mitochondrial DNA ===
Mitochondrial DNA (mtDNA) represents the female lineage. The Qatari mitochondrial DNA shows much more diversity than the Y-DNA lineages, with more than 35% of the lineages showing African ancestry (East African & Subsaharan) & the rest of the lineages being Eurasian.

R0	22%	(14% R0*, 8% H)
JT	22%	(18% J & 4% T)
UK	20%	(11% K & 9% U)
L3	10%	(East African & Subsaharan lineages)
Other lineages	26%	

=== Basal Eurasian DNA ===
Recent genomic research has demonstrated that present-day Qataris retain close affinity to Basal Eurasian lineages, populations that diverged early from other non-African groups before interbreeding with Neanderthals. Analysis of more than 6,000 Qatari genomes revealed that peninsular Arabs are the nearest modern relatives of Neolithic farmers and hunter-gatherers of the ancient Middle East.

== See also ==
- Qatarization
