= Ibn Humayd al-Najdi =

Muḥammad ibn ʻAbd Allāh ibn Ḥumayd محمد بن عبد الله بن حميد

Personal life
- Born: Year unknown Unaizah
- Died: 1878 Taif; Ottoman Empire
- Era: Early modern period (Early Saudi era)
- Region: Najd, Arabian Peninsula
- Main interest(s): ‘Aqīda (Islamic theology); Fiqh (Islamic jurisprudence)
- Notable work(s): Al-Suḥub al-Wābilah ʿAlā Ḍarāʾiḥ al-Ḥanābilah

Religious life
- Religion: Islam
- Denomination: Sunni
- Jurisprudence: Ḥanbalī
- Creed: Atharī

Muslim leader
- Influenced by: Ahmad ibn Hanbal, Aba Butayn

Muḥammad ibn ʻAbd Allāh ibn Ḥumayd (Arabic: محمد بن عبد الله بن حميد; died 1878) known simply as Ibn Ḥumayd al-Najdī was a Muslim scholar of the Hanbali school of thought. He was the head representative and Mufti of the Hanbalis in Mecca during Ottoman rule and was a staunch opponent of Muhammad ibn Abd al-Wahhab and the Wahhabi movement. Ibn Humayd is best known for his biographical work regarding the early Hanbali scholars.

== Biography ==
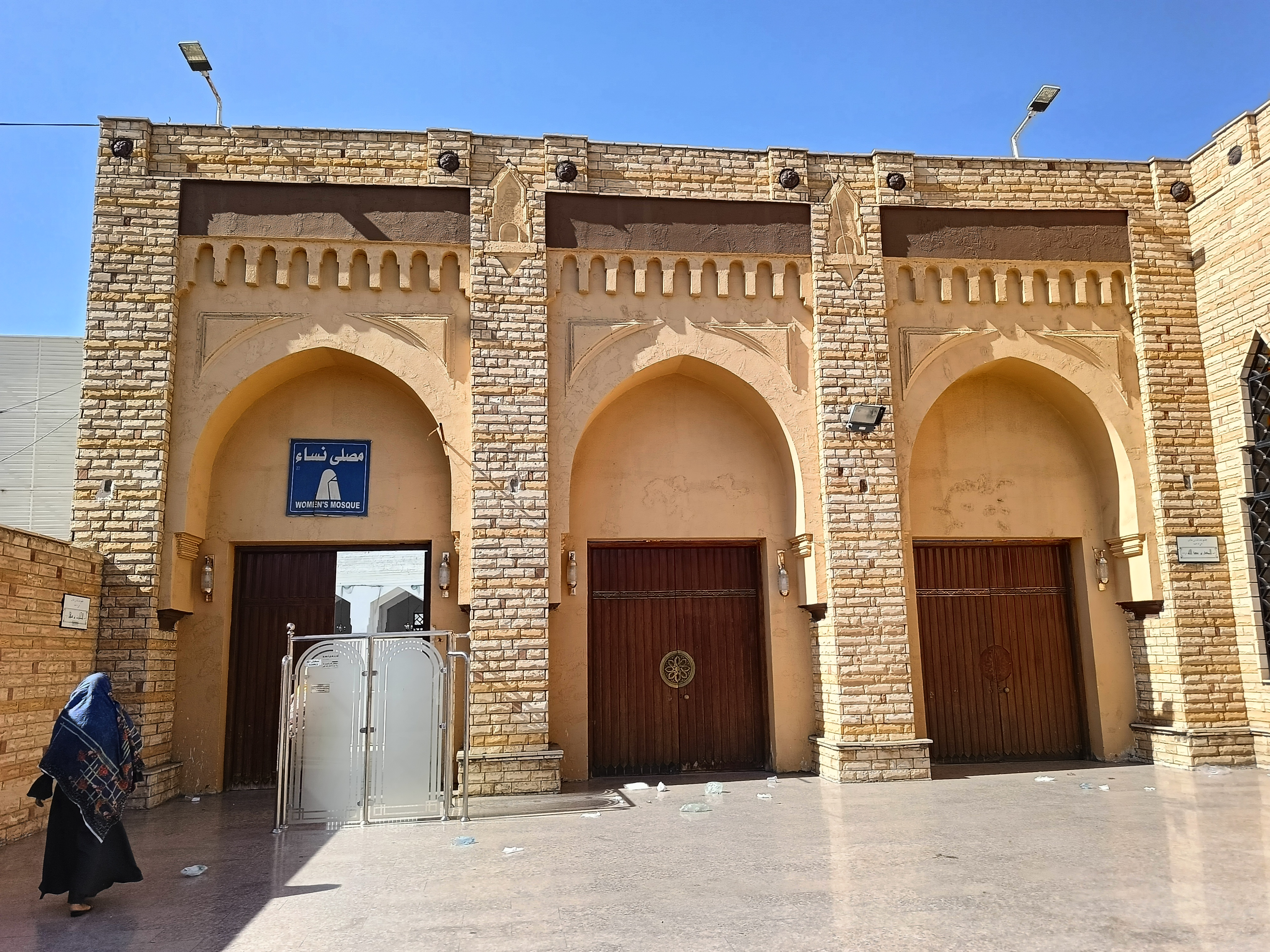
The mosque of Ibn Abbas, where Ibn Humayd spent his final years and was buried in its cemetery.

Muhammad ibn 'Abdullah ibn Humayd was born in the city of Unaizah in the region of Najd. He studied under several teachers throughout the Arabian Peninsula, which included the Qadi (Islamic judge) of Mecca, Aba Butayn. He also had several travels in Egypt and Iraq to study and seek knowledge. At some point in his lifetime, he was appointed as the Mufti of the Hanbali school of thought, serving in Mecca during Ottoman rule. Ibn Humayd al-Najdi died in 1878 and was buried in the cemetery behind the Abd Allah ibn al-Abbas Mosque in Taif.

== Opposition to Wahhabism ==
Ibn Humayd al-Najdi opposed the Wahhabi movement which was slowly emerging during his time. He strongly condemned Muhammad ibn Abd al-Wahhab and refused to write a biography of him in his work, Al-Suḥub al-Wābilah. However, his condemnation of the infamous scholar was largely due to the fact that some of the Wahhabi movement used extreme violence to spread their teachings widely, giving an example of an incident where Sulayman ibn Abd al-Wahhab was threatened by Wahhabi swordsmen. In terms of creedal matters and fiqh, however, Ibn Humayd was in agreement with Muhammad ibn Abd al-Wahhab, and even praised one of the most prominent Wahhabi scholars of the time, Aba Butayn, who was also his teacher.

== Works ==
Ibn Humayd wrote several works on the Hanbali school of thought, such as Al-Suḥub al-Wābilah ʿAlā Ḍarāʾiḥ al-Ḥanābilah, a compilation of biographies of past Hanbali scholars from the times of Ahmad ibn Hanbal to contemporary times which is also considered his best work. He also wrote an annotated version of the Sharḥ Muntaha al-Irādāt, a treatise on Hanbali doctrinal issues that was originally written by the Hanbali scholar Taqi' al-Din Muhammad ibn Ahmad ibn 'Abd al-Aziz al-Futuhi al-Misri.

=== List of works ===
- Al-Suḥub al-Wābilah ʿAlā Ḍarāʾiḥ al-Ḥanābilah
- Ḥāshiyat Ibn Ḥumayd ʿalā Sharḥ Muntahā al-Irādāt li-l-Buhūtī

== See also ==
- Ibn Fayruz
- Ibn Dawud
- List of Atharis
- List of Hanbalis
