= List of Atharis =

Adherents to the creed of Athari Islamic theology

Atharis or Ahl al-Hadith are those who adhere to the creed of Athari theology, which originated in the 8th century CE from the Hanbali scholarly circles of Ahl al-Hadith. The name derives from "tradition" in its technical sense as a translation of the Arabic word "Athar". The Athari school is one of three schools of doctrine in Islam alongside the Ash'ari creed and the Maturidi creed. Atharis are against the usage of metaphorical interpretation such as regarding the revealed attributes of God, and they do not make attempts to conceptualize the meanings of the Quran in a rational manner.

The Atharis became affiliated with the Hanbalis throughout the years as their doctrine originated from there, but they are also affiliated with Wahhabism and the Salafi movement.

== Hanbalis ==
- Ahmad ibn Hanbal
- Ibn Balban
- Ibn Qudama
- Abu Ya'la ibn al-Farra'
- Ibn Taymiyya
- Ibn Qayyim al-Jawziyya
- Ibn Rajab
- Abdullah Ansari
- Ibn Abd al-Hadi
- Mansur al-Buhuti
- Abu Dawud al-Sijistani
- Ibn Hamdan
- Aba Butayn
- Ibn Humayd al-Najdi

== Shafi'is ==
- Al-Darimi
- Ibn Kathir
- Al-Dhahabi
- Uthman ibn Sa'id al-Darimi
- Ibn Khuzaymah
- Abdallah ibn al-Zubayr al-Humaydi
- Jamal al-Din al-Qasimi
- Ahmad al-Hifzi
- Ibrahim al-Kurani

== Malikis ==
- Ibn 'Abd al-Barr
- Abubakar Gumi
- Hamad Al-Ansari

== Hanafis ==
- Ibn Abi al-Izz
- Mahmud Shukri al-Alusi
- Yunus Jaunpuri
- Khandaker Abdullah Jahangir

== Zahiris ==
- Dawud al-Zahiri
- Al-Maqrizi
- Muhammad Taqi-ud-Din al-Hilali

== Independent ==
- Abu Zu'ra al-Razi
- Abu Hatim al-Razi
- Ishaq ibn Rahwayh
- Abu Thawr
- Yahya ibn Ma'in
- Ali ibn al-Madini
- Ibn al-Mundhir
- Muhammad ibn Abd al-Wahhab
- Al-Shawkani
- Ahmad ibn Idris al-Fasi
- Siddiq Hasan Khan
- Rashid Rida
- Sunan Kudus
- Hassan al-Banna
- Al-Albani

== Athari leaders ==
- Al-Mutawakkil
- Mahmud Ghaznavi
- Muhammad ibn Sa'ud al-Muqrin
- Abd al-Aziz bin Muhammad al-Sa'ud
- Sa'ud II
- Turki ibn Abdullah al-Sa'ud

== See also ==
- List of Ash'aris
- List of Maturidis
- Ash'ari theology
- Maturidi theology
- Ibn Kullab
