= Al-Darimi =

Muslim scholar and Imam (797–869)

al-Darimi الدارمي

Personal life
- Born: 181 AH (797 CE) Samarkand, Abbasid Caliphate
- Died: 255 AH (869 CE) Muscat, Abbasid Caliphate
- Era: Islamic Golden Age
- Region: Abbasid Caliphate
- Main interest: Hadith studies
- Notable work: Sunan al-Darimi
- Occupation: Muhaddith, Hadith compiler, Islamic scholar

Religious life
- Religion: Islam
- Denomination: Sunni
- Jurisprudence: Shafi'i
- Creed: Athari

Abd Allah ibn Abd al-Rahman al-Darimi (Arabic: عبد الله بن عبد الرحمن الدارمي, romanized: Abd Allāh ibn ʿAbd al-Raḥmān al-Dārimī; 797–869 CE) was a Muslim scholar and Imam of Arab or Persian ancestry. His best known work is Sunan al-Darimi, a book collection of hadith, considered one of the Nine Books (Al-Kutub Al-Tis’ah).

== Biography ==
Al-Darimi came from the family tribe of Banu Darim ibn Malik ibn Hanzala ibn Zayd ibn Manah ibn Tamim, or the Arab Banu Tamim tribe. He is also known as al-Tamimi, in relation to Tamim ibn Murr, who was one of the ancestors of Banu Darim.

Al-Darimi stated, "I was born in the same year Abd Allah ibn al-Mubarak died, and Abd Allah ibn al-Mubarak died in 181 AH."

Al-Darimi narrated hadith from Yazid ibn Harun, Abd Allah ibn Awn, and others. A number of scholars also narrated hadiths from him, including Muslim ibn al-Hajjaj, Abu Dawud, al-Tirmidhi, and Abu Zur'a al-Razi.

== Works ==
- Sunan al-Darimi: a collection of Muhammad's hadith
- Tafsir al-Darimi: an exegesis mentioned by al-Dhahabi
- Al-Jami'a: mentioned by al-Khatib al-Baghdadi
- Musnad al-Dārimī. Cairo: Dār al-Taʾṣīl, 2015. This Musnad includes many Hadiths in various chapters of jurisprudence. In his compilation, al-Dārimī adopted the method of listing subject matters and chapters, beginning with a great introduction discussing knowledge and its merits, then the Book of Purification, and concluding with the Book of the Virtues of the Qur’an.

== See also ==
- List of pre-modern Arab scientists and scholars
- List of Atharis
