= Tabikha ibn Ilyas =

Ancient tribal leader of pre-Islamic Arabia

Tabikha ibn Ilyas طابخة بن إلياس
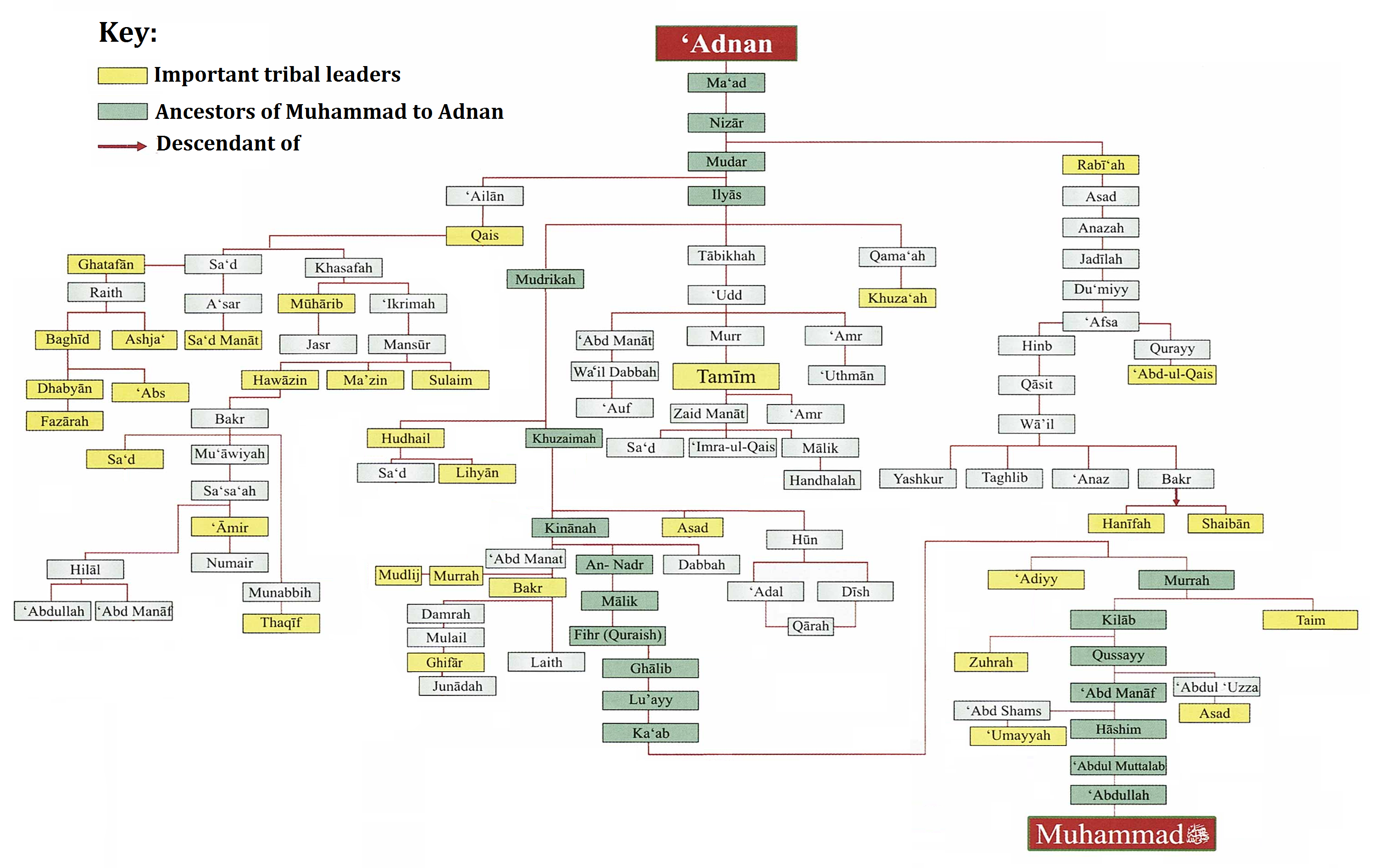
- Family tree showing descent of Muhammad and the Arabian tribes (including Quraysh) from Adnan
- Born: 'Amr ibn Ilyas
- Known for: Being the ancestor of the Banu Tamim, Banu Dabbah, and Banu Muzaina tribes
- Parent: Ilyas ibn Mudar
- Relatives: Mudrikah and Qam'ah (brothers)

Tabikha ibn Ilyas (Arabic: طابخة بن إلياس), also known as 'Amr, was a tribal leader in the era of pre-Islamic Arabia. Among his descendants include the famous Banu Tamim tribe.

== Family ==
The real name of Tabikha was 'Amr ibn Ilyas; he had two other brothers with the birthnames 'Amir and 'Umayr whom were later known by the names Mudrikah and Qam'ah respectively. Tabikha's father was Ilyas ibn Mudar, while his mother was a woman known as Khindif.

The lineage of Tabikha can be traced back to Adnan: Tabikha, son of Ilyas, son of Mudar, son of Nizar, son of Ma'ad, son of Adnan. Hence, Tabikha is an Adnanite Arab and also a descendant of Ishmael, as is the case for all the Adnanites.

== Descendants ==
Amongst the descendants of Tabikha ibn Ilyas include these three tribes:

- Banu Tamim: Descended from Tamim ibn Murr, their lineage back to Tabikha from Tamim is traced as Tamim, son of Murr, son of 'Udd, son of Tabikha.
- Banu Dabbah: Descended from Dabbah ibn 'Udd, who is the grandson of Tabikha.
- Banu Muzaina: Descended from Muzaina ibn 'Udd, another grandson of Tabikha.

== See also ==
- Tribes of Arabia
