= Banu Dabbah =

Adnanite Arab tribe

Banu Dabbah بنو ضبة
- Adnanite Arabs
- Ethnicity: Arab
- Nisba: aḍ-Ḍabbī
- Location: Hijaz, Oman
- Descended from: Wa'il Dabbah ibn 'Abd Manat ibn 'Udd ibn Tabikha ibn Ilyas ibn Mudar ibn Nizar ibn Ma'add ibn Adnan
- Religion: South Arabian polytheism (until 630 CE); Islam (currently)

Banu Dabbah (Arabic: بنو ضبة) is an Arab tribe of Adnanite descent. They merged with the Banu Tamim tribe and their descendants are considered to be part of both tribes. The Banu Dabbah currently reside in Oman and the Hijaz.

== Tribal lineage ==
They are descended from Wa'il Dabbah ibn 'Abd Manat, whose full lineage (according to Ibn Hazm) is Wa'il Dabbah, son of 'Abd Manat, son of 'Udd, son of Tabikha, son of Ilyas, son of Mudar, son of Nizar, son of Ma'add, son of Adnan. This lineage hence makes the Banu Dabbah a tribe descended from the Mudar tribal group as well as an Adnanite tribe.

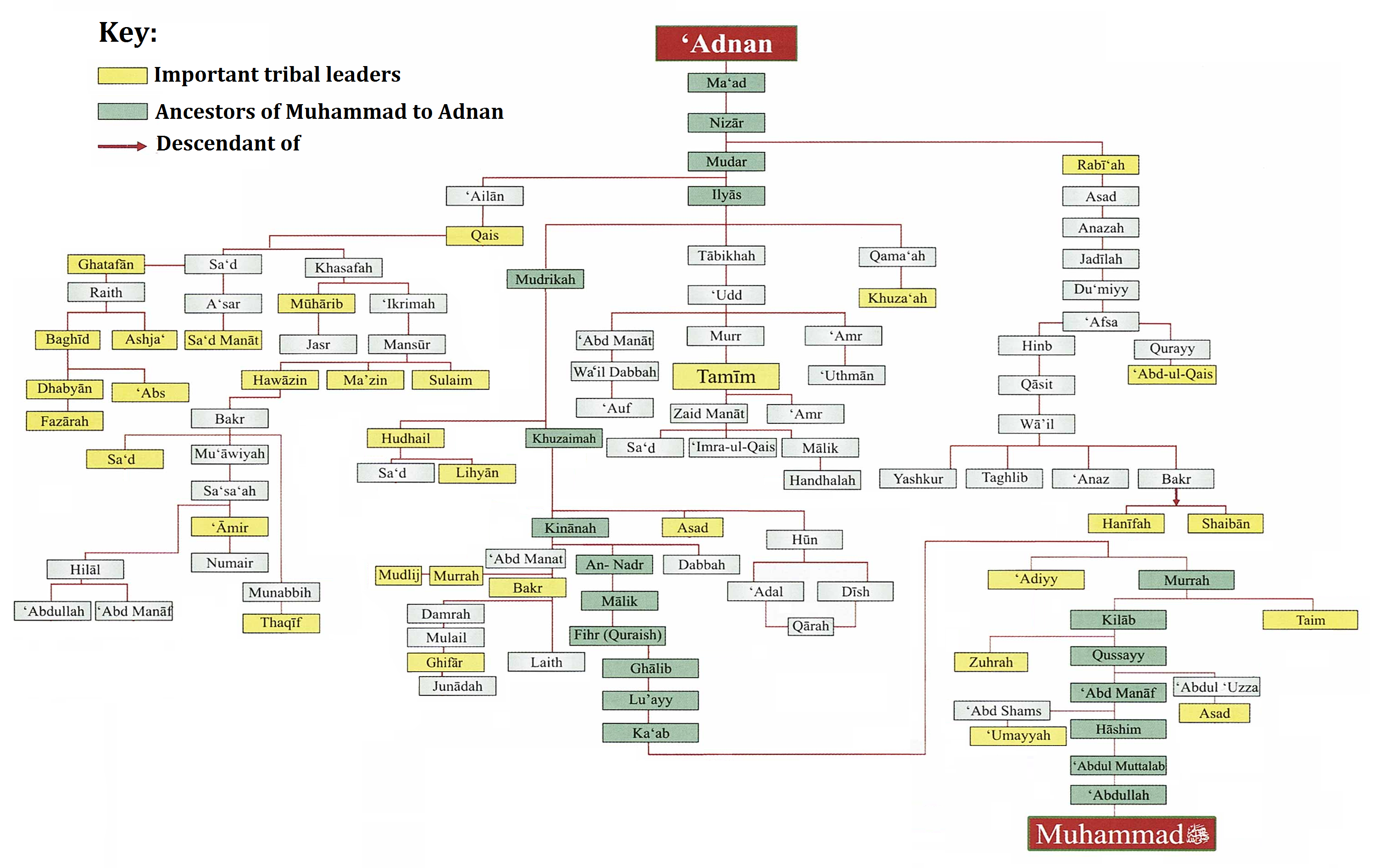
A family tree of Adnan and his descendants, all the way until Muhammad. The Banu Tamim and the Banu Dabbah (Wa'il Dabbah) are visible in this chart.

The Banu Dabbah merged with Banu Tamim after the progenitor of the latter, Tamim ibn Murr, married a woman from the former.

== History ==
After the Conquest of Mecca in 630 CE, all of the Arabian tribes in the Hijaz and Mecca became Muslims; the Banu Dabbah potentially were amongst them. After the death of the Islamic prophet Muhammad, the Banu Dabbah fought alongside the forces of Aisha, Zubayr and Talha in the Battle of the Camel in 656 CE.

In modern times, the Banu Dabbah migrated to the country of Oman while some of them still lived in their villages at Najd.

== Notable people ==
- Al-Mufaddal ad-Dabbi, 8th-century Arabic philologist and grammarian
- Nur al-Din al-Salimi, scholar of Ibadi Islam

== See also ==
- Tribes of Arabia
