= Al Khater =

Prominent family in the Arabian Peninsula

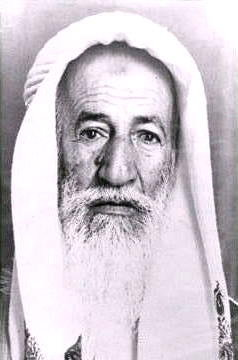
Sheikh Mohammed bin Ali Al Khater ( الشيخ محمد بن علي آل خاطر)

Al Khater (Arabic: آل خاطر) is a prominent family in the Arabian Peninsula. They belong to the Al Buainain branch of Banu Tamim. The family has a presence in several Arabian Peninsula countries including Saudi Arabia, Qatar and Bahrain. The Al Khater have built two major cities in the Arabian Peninsula: Jubail in Saudi Arabia, and Al Wakrah, the former capital of Qatar.

The Al Khater maintain close family and political ties with the Al Saud (rulers of Saudi Arabia), the Al Khalifa (rulers of Bahrain), and the Al Thani (rulers of Qatar).

== Al Khater and Al Saud ==
The relation between the two families started when Mohammed bin Hassan Al Khater found Abdul Rahman ibn Faisal, the last ruler of the Second Saudi State, seeking refuge in his mosque in Bahrain when he was defeated by Al Rashid and forced into exile. He offered him and those with him (including his son, the later King Abdul Aziz) his house to sleep in, and Mohammed bin Hassan then helped Abdul Rahman reach Isa ibn Ali Al-Khalifa. In Saudi Arabia, during the unification war when Abdul-Aziz bin Saud was trying to unify the Kingdom of Saudi Arabia, Al Khater (Sheikh Mohammed bin Ali Al Khater, ruler of Jubail) joined forces with Abdul-Aziz bin Saud (e.g. battle of Kinzan, 1915) and they helped in the unification war in the region that Al Khater controlled and in the nearby territories. After the unification war, King Abdul-Aziz had a strong relationship with leaders of Al Khater, whom he used to visit from time to time, and he even wanted to marry one of the daughters of Sheikh Mohammed bin Ali Al Khater, ruler of Jubail at that time, but his daughters were married.

== Al Khater and Al Khalifa ==
Sheikh Mohammed bin Hassan Al Khater had solid ties with the heads of Al Khalifa (ruling family of Bahrain). His relationship with them was based on respect and good manners; he himself used to own many farms in Bahrain, including the one that is still there near Bahrain International Airport where everyone nowadays can see part of one of his old farms during landing and take off. Sheikh Mohammed bin Hassan helped in trading Sheikh Ibrahim bin Ali Al Khalifa for Sheikh Qassim bin Mohammed Al-Thani where Sheikh Ibrahim was captured in Qatar and Sheikh Qassim was captured in Bahrain.

== Al Khater and Al Thani ==
Al Khater and Al Thani (the ruling family of Qatar) have close ties. Sheikh Qassim bin Mohammed bin Thani Al Thani (second ruler of Qatar) was imprisoned in Bahrain, and members of Al Khater were the ones responsible for getting him out of prison, where they traded Sheikh Qassim for Sheikh Ibrahim bin Ali Al Khalifa, who was captured in Qatar. Later on, the family ties got stronger when Sheikh Mohammed bin Hassan Al Khater married Sheikha Sabika, daughter of Sheikh Qassim. The ties got stronger and stronger as Sheikh Fahad bin Mohammed bin Hassan married Sheikha Nora, the only daughter of Sheikh Ali bin Qassim Al Thani (Jouan) and granddaughter of Sheikh Qassim; also, Sheikha Mariam bint Khater Al Khater married Sheikh Abdulrahman bin Qassim, the head of Al Abdulrahman of Al Thani. The family ties between Al Khater and Al Thani are one of the strongest ties in Qatar due to the marriages that occur between these two families.

== Dispute over Al Khater ==
As Al Khater grew bigger and stronger, families and tribes of the Arabian Peninsula had many relationships with the family, many of those relationships lead many families and tribes to try to get closer to Al Khater by either calling them their cousins or calling them a family of the same tribe, in order to honor their own tribe with the name of Al Khater. For example Banu Khalid; whom descends from Khalid ibn al-Walid. In fact, the alliance between Al Khater and Banu Khalid led to this misunderstanding. However, the historical sources clearly stated the root of Al Khater family is belong to Banu Tamim, as well a Al Khater made it clear that they belong to Banu Tamim. It was clear that whoever called Al Khater one of their families is just to honor that tribe and had nothing to do with the family but it was the choice and decision of that tribe such as Banu Khalid when they named Al Khater a family of their own.

== Figures ==
- Sheikh Ali bin Rashed bin Mubarak Al Khater: ruler of Al Wakrah.
- Sheikh Abdulla bin Ali Al Khater: ruler of Al Wakrah and one of three founders of Jubail.
- Sheikh Mohammed bin Ali Al Khater: ruler and one of three founders of Jubail.
- Sheikh Mohammed bin Hassan Al Khater: head of Al Khater in Bahrain.
- Abdulrahman bin Khalid Al Khater: former president of the Amiri Diwan in Qatar.
- Mubarak bin Ali Al Khater: former Minister of Foreign Affairs in Qatar.
- Ali bin Mohammed Al Khater: former Minister of Municipality in Qatar.
- Rashed bin Mohammed Al Khater: Qatar's Ex-Ambassador to United Kingdom, Tunis and Libya.
- Fahad bin Fahad Al Khater: Qatar's Ex-Ambassador to Russia and Syria, and first Qatari Ambassador to Austria.
- Abdulla bin Mohammed Al Khater: Qatar's Ex-Ambassador to Yemen, Lebanon, and Oman.
- Khalid bin Fahad Al Khater :Qatar's Ex-Ambassador to Denmark and Netherlands.
- Rashed bin Ali Al Khater: Qatar's Ex-Ambassador to Singapore and Bulgaria.
- Mohammed bin Khater Al Khater: Qatar's Ex-Ambassador to Indonesia, and current Qatari Ambassador to India.
- Yousif bin Ali Al Khater: Qatar's Ex-Ambassador to Australia and United Kingdom, and current member of the Shura Council of Qatar.
- Sultan bin Ali Al Khater: Qatar's current Ambassador to Bahrain.
- Khalid bin Salman Al Khater: former president of Engineering Precinct in Qatar.
- Rashed bin Mohammed Al Khater: first Shura Council of Qatar member of Al Khater.
- Khalid bin Mohammed Al Khater: former member and Deputy Speaker of the Shura Council of Qatar.
- Yousif bin Rashid Al Khater: former member of the Shura Council of Qatar.
- Khalid bin Nasser Al Khater, Ph.D.: Dean of Academic Affairs at Ahmed bin Mohammed Military College and Vice President for Administration and Financial Affairs at Qatar University.
- Al Hareth Mohammed bin Rashed Al Khater, M.D.: Clinical Assistant Professor at Qatar University.
- Hessah bint Mohammed Al Khater: Assistant Professor of Dawa and Ehtisab at Qatar University.
- Lolwah bint Rashed Al Khater: Current Assistant Foreign Minister and spokesperson for the Ministry of Foreign Affairs in Qatar.
- Salman bin Khalid Al Khater: champion of GT Academy Middle East Season 1, 2013.
- Mohammed bin Fahad Al Khater: Space Camp Ambassador U.S. Space & Rocket Center, Huntsville ALABAMA.
- Sultan bin Rashid Al Khater: Current Undersecretary of Ministry of Commerce and Industry.
