= Nasser Ahmed Al Meer =

Qatari volleyball player

Personal information
- Full name: Nassir Ahmed Ali
- Nickname: Naser Al-Mayr
- Nationality: Qatari
- Born: 19 August 1987 (age 39); Doha
- Hometown: Doha
- Height: 190 cm (6 ft 3 in)
- Weight: 71 KG
- Education: Qatar University

Volleyball information
- Position: Position 2, Position 4
- Current club: Al-Arabi SC
- Number: 7

National team
Qatar men's national volleyball team

Nasser Ahmed Al Meer (Arabic: ناصر احمد علي born 19 August 1987 ) a Qatari beach volleyball player, the captain of the Qatar men's national beach volleyball team, and a silver medalist of the ANOC World Beach Games 2019. He represents Al-Arabi SC.

== Sports career ==
Naser began his sports career with Al-Wakrah SC. He has participated in several Arab, Asian and European championships as well as training camps between 2002 and 2021. In 2018, he moved to Al-Khor SC. He won a silver medal at the 20109 ANOC World Games.

== National and international participation ==
- Katara Beach Volleyball Cup (2018)
- Asian Beach Volleyball Spectacle (2018)
- ANOC World Beach Games (2019)
- Aspire Beach Volleyball Cup
- Doha Beach Volleyball Cup (2021)

== Achievements ==
- Silver medal in ANOC World Games Championship: 2019
- Qatar Cup: 2019
- Emir Cup: 2019

== Clubs ==
- (Qatar) Al-Arabi SC
- (Qatar) Al-Khor SC
- (Qatar) Al-Wakrah SC
