= Ibn Balban =

Ibn Balbān

Personal life
- Born: Muḥammad ibn Badr al-Dīn; 1597 Damascus, Ottoman Empire
- Died: 1672 (aged 74–75) Damascus
- Era: Medieval
- Region: Levant
- Main interest: Islamic jurisprudence
- Notable work: See below

Religious life
- Religion: Islam
- Denomination: Sunni
- Jurisprudence: Ḥanbalī
- Creed: Athari

Muslim leader
- Influenced by: Ahmad ibn Hanbal, Ibn Hamdan
- Influenced: Al-Muhibbi, Ibn al-Imad al-Hanbali

Ibn Balbān (c. 1597–1672) was a Sunni Muslim scholar and jurist of the Hanbali school. He was the teacher of the Hanbali jurist and historian, Ibn al-Imad, and the Damascene historian, Al-Muhibbi.

== Biography ==
His real name was Muhammad ibn Badr al-Din. He was born between the years 1597 and 1598 in Damascus to a scholarly family of Lebanese origin. Ibn Balban studied the science of hadith under two teachers, Shihab al-Ithhawi al-Kabir and Shams al-Maydani, both of which later gave him the ijazah and qualifications for a muhaddith. Ibn Balban was later appointed as a mufti for the Hanbali school in Damascus and given a high status in the As-Salihiyya neighborhood at the foot of Mount Qasioun. He had also attained the position of mujtahid and was qualified in studying the other three schools of thought, but chose to stay affiliated with the Hanbali school. As a muhaddith, students from the Ottoman Empire studied under him and narrated from him, which included the Damascene historian Al-Muhibbi and the Hanbali jurist Ibn al-Imad. Another student of his was Abu al-Mawahib al-Hanbali, a traditionalist and Sufi ascetic who became the leader of the Hanbali scholars in Damascus in 1661. Ibn Balban died of old age in 1672.

== Theology ==
In his Qala'id al-Iqyan, a summary of Ibn Hamdan's Nihayat al-Mubtadiyyin, he strengthens the Athari/Hanbali creed with arguments and strong propositions and eliminates various distortions that are often misunderstood by those outside the Hanbali school. The essence of the work lies in reinforcing the concept of "Tanzih" - the transcendance of God above any resemblance to human beings. Simultaneously, he refutes unfound accusations of tajsim (corporealism) and tashbih (likening God to the creation) leveled against the Hanbali school.

In the work, Ibn Balban, like some other Hanbali scholars, explicitly rejects the notion that God occupies a physical location above the Throne. In the first section of the book, Ibn Balban addresses the concept of "marifatullah", stating that it is a religious obligation upon every mukallaf (legally responsible) individual. However, Ibn Balban establishes strict limits regarding what can and cannot be known by humans about God. For Ibn Balban, "marifatullah" does not involve comprehending the essence (dhat) of God, as that is impossible; neither God nor his attributes resemble creation.

== Works ==
- Akhṣar al-Mukhtaṣarāt ("The Supreme Synopsis") is a general guide to Islamic jurisprudence according to the Hanbali school. In 2016, Islamic scholar Musa Furber wrote an abridged and annotated version of it in the English language, which was titled Hanbali Acts of Worship.
- Mukhtaṣar al-'Ifādāt ("The Summary of Benefits") is a foundational text covering the topics of faith, jurisprudence and theology.
- Qalaʾid al-ʿIqyān ("The Golden Pendant") is a treatise on the solidified creed of the Hanbali school, as well as an abridgement of an earlier treatise by Ibn Hamdan.

== See also ==
- List of Hanbalis
- List of Atharis
