= Al-Maadeed =

Tribe in Qatar

Al-Ma'adeed
- Mudarite Arab tribe
- Ethnicity: Arab
- Nisba: Al-Ma'adeed
- Location: Qatar, Kuwait, United Arab Emirates, Saudi Arabia
- Descended from: Mihadd ibn Rays ibn Zakher ibn Muhammad ibn Alawi ibn Waheb ibn Qasem ibn Musa ibn Masud ibn Uqba ibn Senai’ ibn Nahshel ibn Shaddad ibn Zuhair ibn Shehab ibn Rabi'a ibn Abu Soud ibn Malik ibn Hanzala ibn Malik ibn Zayd Manat ibn Tamim ibn Murr ibn 'Udd ibn Tabikhah ibn Ilyas ibn Mudar ibn Nizar ibn Ma'add ibn Adnan
- Parent tribe: Banu Hanzala
- Branches: Al-Thani, Al-Mehshadi, Al-Ghanim, Al-Ali, Al-Badi, Al-Aseeri, Al-Farhood, Al-Bin-Ubood, Al-Khalaf, Al-Ibrahim, al-Talh(extinct)
- Religion: Sunni Islam

Al Maadeed (Arabic: المعاضيد) is one of the primary tribes in Qatar.

The ruling family of Qatar, the Al Thani, descends from the Al Maadeed tribe. Though they are mainly present in Qatar, there are also Maadeed members in Kuwait and Saudi Arabia. The Al Maadeed are descendants of the Bani Tamim. Historically, the Binali tribe had a tribal alliance with the Al Maadeed.

The founder of Qatar, Sheikh Mohammed bin Thani, was chosen from the Al Maadeed tribe as the leader of modern Qatar due to his exemplary personal qualities and friendliness. Today, the descendants of Mohammed bin Thani, the Al-Thani Al Maadeed, continue to lead Qatar.

J.G. Lorimer's book Gazetteer of the Persian Gulf states that in 1908, there were 875 members of the Al Maadeed tribe in Qatar, mainly centered in Al Wakrah, Lusail, and the capital Doha.

Ibrahim bin Jarallah bin Dekhnah Al Sharifi's book Al-Maadheed and Qatar: the history and pedigree and civilization (pp. 144–148, first edition 1999) also provides detailed history.
