= 2023 Qatar espionage case =

Case in Qatar against Indian Navy Officers

2023 Qatar Case against Retired Indian Navy Officers
- Date: August 2022 – February 2024
- Location: Doha, Qatar
- Type: Espionage
- Target: A secret Qatari submarine project
- Outcome: All released
- Suspects: Eight former Indian Navy officers
- Accused: All eight
- Convicted: Yes, commuted in higher appeal
- Charges: Not made public
- Verdict: Formerly death penalty, commuted to jail sentences

In August 2022, eight former Indian Navy officers were detained in Doha, Qatar. While charges against them were not made public by Qatari authorities, media reports speculated that they were "spying for Israel", which was later found to be untrue. The spying allegations were never made or accepted by either of the governments. Following long diplomatic and legal efforts, the charges of all but one of them were commuted in December 2023, and they were released and reached New Delhi by February 2024. One of them, Commander Purnendu Tiwari, remains detained as of February 2026.

== Background ==
Millions of Indian nationals reside in the Persian Gulf region, with tens of thousands employed in semi-skilled and low-income jobs. These migrant workers have been instrumental in the development of the economies of Gulf Arab states and serve as a crucial source of remittances for India.

The company, Dahra Global Technologies and Consultancy Services, for whom the eight Indians worked, described itself as a "local business partner" of Qatar's governmental agencies including defence.

In 2020, Qatar signed a memorandum of understanding (MoU) with Fincantieri — an Italian shipbuilding firm — to build submarines. The project also involved the maintenance of Qatar's naval fleet and construction of a naval base. However, the MoU was reportedly not implemented. As of May 2023, the Fincantieri company had no existing contracts for submarines with Qatar. However, based on a 2016 agreement with the Qatar's Ministry of Defence, work on finishing seven surface vessels – including four corvettes, two patrol vessels and one amphibious vessel was in progress.

Qatar is reportedly seeking a smaller variety of the U212 Near Future submarine, a submarine project in Italy built with a German firm's cooperation.

== Arrest ==
On 30 August 2022, the former Indian Navy officers, Captain Navtej Singh Gill, Captain Birendra Kumar Verma, Captain Saurabh Vasisht, Commander Amit Nagpal, Commander Purnendu Tiwari, Commander Sugunakar Pakala, Commander Sanjeev Gupta and Sailor Ragesh, were arrested from Doha by the Qatari intelligence service.

According to reports, they were in charge of teaching the Qatari Navy and were employed by a private company run by an officer from the Oman Air Force that offered training and other services to Qatar's armed forces. The arrested Indian nationals' bail requests were denied by Qatari authorities eight times. The men had their case forwarded to court by the public prosecutor.

Up till December 2022, India's MEA indicated that no charges were pressed. It said in a weekly media briefing: "If they say that the charges have not yet been pressed, let's take it at that value."

== Trial and verdict ==
In late March 2023, the eight men had their first trial.

On 26 October 2023, the eight former Indian naval officers working for the Al Dahra consulting company, which was advising the Qatari government on the acquisition of submarines, were handed death sentences by a Qatari court. The charges against the eight men were not made public by either the Indian government or the Qatari authorities. Some news outlets, citing unnamed sources, said the men were charged with spying for Israel.

In December 2023, as per India's foreign ministry, the death sentences were commuted. However, the new penalty they would face was not specified. The authorities later found that there was no evidence to support the case, and the 8 Naval officers were released.

In 12 February 2024 the Indian Government released a statement welcoming and celebrating the release of all eight former Indian Navy officers and thanked the Emir of Qatar for facilitating their release.

According to an article from February 2026, one of the officers, Commander Purnendu Tiwari, still remains detained in Doha, with his family seeking intervention from the Prime Minister of India.

== Reactions ==
The detained Indian nationals in Qatar were actively sought for consular access by the Indian mission in Doha, according to the Ministry of External Affairs of India (MEA). Arindam Bagchi, the spokesperson for the MEA, said that the Indian Embassy in Doha spoke with the Qatari government and that Indian diplomats visited the arrested individuals to inquire about their wellbeing. The families of the arrested individuals were in continuous contact with the Indian embassy in Doha, which was also providing consular and legal support. The MEA withheld any information pertaining to the accusations made against the former officers.

According to the Hindustan Times, an Indian journalist and their spouse were also ordered by Qatari authorities to leave the country for reporting on the case.

== See also ==
- Capital punishment in Qatar
- Kulbhushan Jadhav – Indian national in Pakistani custody (born 1970)
- India–Qatar relations
