= Indians in Qatar =

Expatriate and ethnic community

Total population
- 691,000; 25% of Qatar's population (2017)

Regions with significant populations
- Doha • Al Wakrah • Al Khor • Al Rayyan

Languages
- Malayalam • Telugu • Tamil • Urdu • Bengali • Punjabi • Hindi • English • Gujarati • Arabic • Kannada

Religion
- Hinduism • Christianity • Islam • Sikhism

Related ethnic groups
- Indian diaspora

The community of Indians in Qatar includes Indian expatriates in Qatar, as well as people of Indian origin born in Qatar. Qatar has a total population of 2,740,479 as of May 2019. The Indian population in the country currently stands at around 691,000. As of 2024, the Indian population in Qatar made up approximately 25% of Qatar's total populace, with most of them being migrant workers.

== Overview ==
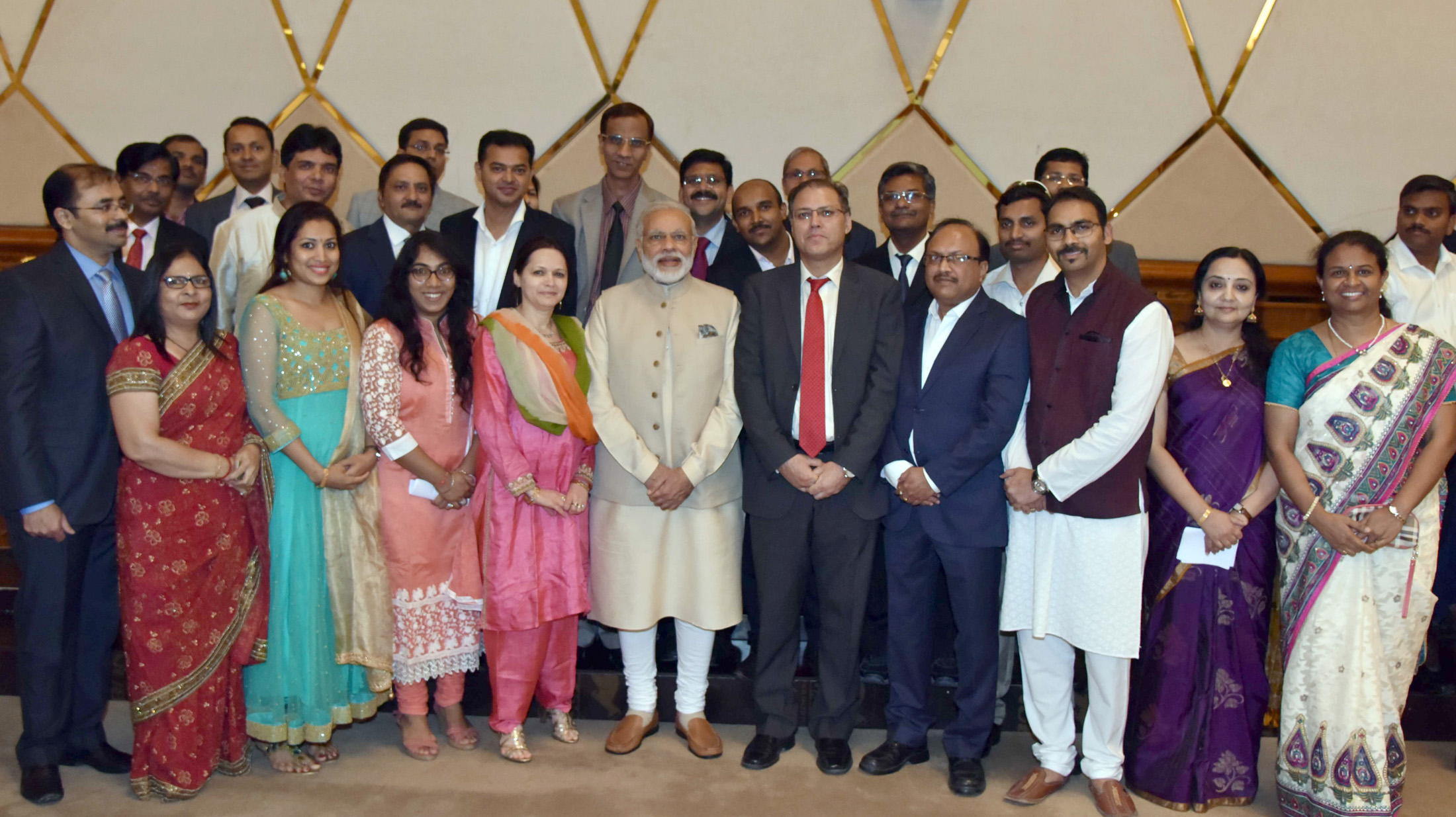
India's Prime Minister Narendra Modi at a community reception in Doha, 2016

More and more Indian students in Qatar, especially Doha, are opting for distance education programmes after passing their higher secondary examinations. After clearing their Central Board of Secondary Education (CBSE) Class 12 exams, the students are making a beeline for the various distance education programmes offered by a number of Indian universities in Qatar.

There is also a sizable population of second or third generation Qatari-born Indians. They share characteristics with other third culture kids, forming a cultural identity that blends their heritage culture and the myriad of foreign cultures they encounter growing up in Qatar, and a more fluid sense of home. Those who grow up in western compounds tend to be well-assimilated into western culture, whereas those who stay in Indian neighborhoods such as Najma or Mughlina tend to be more in touch with India. Many Qatari-born Indians further migrate to countries such as the United States, Canada, Australia and New Zealand both for greater economic and lifestyle opportunities, and due to the Qatar's restrictive citizenship practices; many are forced to leave when no longer deemed valuable by the government. There is also a large area known as Asian Town specifically targeted at working class Indian immigrants.

== Controversy ==
=== Migrant worker deaths and the 2022 FIFA World Cup ===
According to the Guardian’s February 2021 report, around 6,500 migrant workers from India, Pakistan, Nepal, Bangladesh and Sri Lanka have died in Qatar since it won the bid for the 2022 FIFA World Cup. FIFA and Qatari authorities have failed to compensate migrant workers for abuses, including wage theft and unexplained deaths. In 2024, Amnesty International criticized FIFA and Qatar for not yet addressing the "severe" human rights violations surrounding the hosting of the 2022 World Cup, claiming that they are not taking responsibility for "the vast number of migrant workers who were exploited and in many cases died to make the 2022 World Cup possible". In 2025, Amnesty reported that "the Qatari authorities continued to fail to investigate effectively the deaths of migrant workers and to hold employers or authorities accountable, preventing any assessment of whether the deaths were work-related and depriving families of the opportunity to receive compensation." Also in 2025, Human Rights Watch have stated that despite scrutiny regarding migrant worker deaths building up to the tournament, Qatar "has failed to prevent, investigate, or compensate" for the deaths of thousands of them.

=== Allegation of Spying ===
In October 2023, eight former Indian naval officers working for the Al Dahra consulting company, which was advising the Qatari government on the acquisition of submarines, were handed death sentences on 'spying charges' by a Qatari court. The charges against the eight men were not made public by either the Indian government or the Qatari authorities. Some news outlets, citing unnamed sources, said the men were charged with spying for Israel.

In December 2023, as per India's foreign ministry, the death sentences were commuted. However, the new penalty the former Indian naval officer would face was not specified.

In February 2024, all eight ex-navy personals were freed and sent to India.

== Education ==
Indian schools in Qatar include:

- Birla Public School
- Doha Modern Indian School
- DPS Modern Indian School
- Ideal Indian School
- M.E.S Indian school
- Shantiniketan Indian School
- Bhavans Public School
- Delhi Public School
- Al Khor International School
- Loyola International School (LIS, Doha)
- Noble International School (NIS)
- Pearl School (Pearl)
- Rajagiri Public School

== Notable people ==
- Tahsin Jamshid, Qatar international footballer

== See also ==
- India–Qatar relations
- Embassy of India, Doha
- Indian Cultural Centre (ICC Qatar)
- Indian Community Facebook Page
- Migrant workers in the Gulf Cooperation Council region
- Indian diaspora
- Demographics of Qatar
