= Ibn Fayruz =

Personal life
- Born: Muhammad bin Abdullah al-Fayruz al-Tamimi al-Najdi; 10 October 1729 Al-Ahsa Governorate, eastern Saudi Arabia
- Died: 13 May 1801 (aged 71) Az Zubayr, Basra, Iraq
- Resting place: Zubayr ibn al-Awwam Mosque at Basra, Iraq
- Occupation: Religious scholar, cleric and preacher

Religious life
- Religion: Islam
- Denomination: Sunni
- Jurisprudence: Hanbali
- Creed: Athari

Muslim leader
- Influenced by: Abdullah bin al-Fayruz, Muhammad Hayyat ibn Ibrahim al-Sindhi
- Influenced: Ibn Dawud

Ibn Fayruz (d. 1801), real name Muhammad bin Abdullah al-Fayruz al-Tamimi al-Najdi was a Hanbali jurist, best known for his criticism of the Wahhabi movement.

== Works ==
- Al-Radd 'ala man Kaffara Ahl al-Riyadh wa-man Hawlahum min al-Muslimin.

== See also ==
- Ibn Dawud
- Sulayman ibn Abd al-Wahhab
- Ahmad Zayni Dahlan
