= Ahmad al-Hifzi =

Aḥmad ibn ʿAbd al-Qādir al-Ḥifẓī

Personal life
- Born: 1732 Rijal Almaa
- Died: 1818 (aged 85–86) Rijal Almaa; Emirate of Nejd
- Era: Early modern period
- Region: Asir, Arabian Peninsula
- Main interests: Sufism (Islamic mysticism); Fiqh (Islamic jurisprudence)
- Notable work: ʿUqd Jawāhir al-Laʾāl fīmā warada min Faḍāʾil al-Āl

Religious life
- Religion: Islam
- Denomination: Sunni
- Jurisprudence: Shāfiʿī
- Creed: Atharī

Muslim leader
- Influenced by: Muhammad ibn Abd al-Wahhab
- Influenced: Siddiq Hasan Khan

Aḥmad ibn ʿAbd al-Qādir al-Ḥifẓī (1732–1818) was an Islamic scholar of the Shafi'i school and a former Sufi mystic from Asir, now present-day Saudi Arabia. Born in Asir, he received his ijazah in Zabid and subsequently became a leading scholar of Asir, temporarily adopting Sufism, before leaving it for Wahhabism, which he died upon.

== Biography ==
His full name was Aḥmad bin ʿAbd al-Qādir bin Bakrī al-ʿUjaylī ar-Rijālī. He was born in 1732, in the village of Rijal Almaa in Asir. He studied under scholars of the Shafi'i school, the dominant school of thought in Asir at the time, travelling to Zabid to further his education and receive his ijazah. After he had completed his studies in religion and receiving the ijazah to teach, Al-Hifzi became a Sufi mystic, donning the Khirqa and following a "moderate" path of the Qadiri Order that stuck to the practices of its founder Abdul Qadir Gilani. Between 1750 and 1760, Al-Hifzi slowly became disillusioned with Sufism due to influences of missionaries belonging to the Wahhabi movement and by 1780, he was amongst the sympathizers of the Wahhabis. He died in 1818 and was buried in a cemetery in his hometown in Asir.

== Works ==
- ʿUqd Jawāhir al-Laʾāl fīmā warada min Faḍāʾil al-Āl (The Necklace of Pearl Jewels on What Has Been Reported of the Virtues of the Family) – A written work in manuscript format which details the stories of the Ahl al-Bayt and descendants of the Islamic prophet Muhammad.

== See also ==
- List of Shafi'i scholars
- List of Atharis
- Wahhabism
