= Banu Sa'd ibn Zayd Manat =

Banu Sa'd ibn Zayd Manat بنو سعد بن زيد منات
- Adnanite Arabs
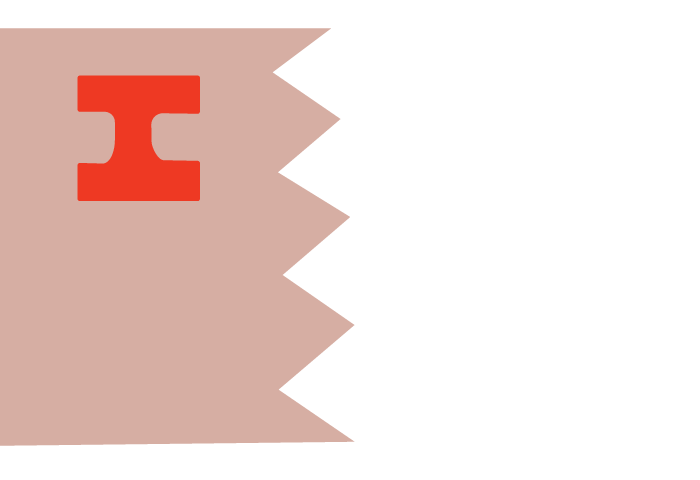
- Banner of Banu Sa'd ibn Zayd Manat
- Ethnicity: Arab
- Nisba: Al-Sa'di
- Location: Arabian Peninsula
- Descended from: Sa'd ibn Zayd Manat
- Religion: Paganism, later Islam

Banu Sa'd ibn Zayd Manat (Arabic: بنو سعد بن زيد مناة) is a pre-Islamic Arab tribe. It is considered one of the main three branches of Tamim, the other two are Banu Hanzalah and 'Amr ibn Tamim.

== Ancestry ==
The tribe members trace their lineage to Sa'd ibn Zayd Manat ibn Tamim ibn Murr ibn 'Id ibn Amr ibn Ilyas ibn Mudar ibn Nizar ibn Ma'ad ibn Adnan.

Sa'd ibn Zayd Manat had seven sons: Ka'b, 'Amr, al-Harith, 'Awafa, Jashm, Malik and 'Abshams.

There are also sub-clans to the Banu Sa'd ibn Zayd Manat:

- Banu al-Haram
- Banu Hamman
- Banu al-A'raj
- Banu Qurai'
- Banu Bahdala
- Banu Barniq
- Banu 'Utarid

== History ==
A popular Arabic proverb seems to revolve around the progenitor of this tribe, Sa'd ibn Zayd Manat:

أوردها سعدٌ وسعدٌ مشتمل ما هكذا تورد يا سعد الإبل

"Sa'd watered them, but was still wearing his cloak. Camels are not to be watered thus, O Sa'd."

it is Malik, Sa'd's brother who said it. Because Sa'd did not take good care of the camels left to him to attend by his brother who was busy with his marriage.

== See also ==
- Tribes of Arabia
- Pre-Islamic Arabia
- Manat (goddess)
