= Aktham ibn Sayfi =

Arab orator, judge and sage

- أكثم بن صيفي التميمي
- Born: Najd, Arabia
- Died: 44 AH (c. 664 CE); Arabia
- Occupations: Poet, Orator, Judge, Sage
- Writing career
- Language: Arabic
- Notable work: Proverbs

Aktham ibn Sayfi al-Tamimi (Arabic: أكثم بن صيفي التميمي) (d.44 AH) was a pre-Islamic Arab orator, judge, sage and poet, mostly famous for his proverbs. He was also known as Qadi al-Arab (lit. Judge of the Arabs).

Little is known about his life with certainty. He was born in Najd to the Usayyid branch of the tribe of Banu Tamim and was one of the most influential men of his tribe. Aktham is regarded as one of the muʿammarūn; people known for their longevity. His death occurred on 44 AH.
