= Ibn Hamdan =

13th-century Muslim scholar, Judge and Theologian

Ibn Ḥamdān ابن حمدان

Personal life
- Born: 1206 CE; Harran, Sultanate of Rum
- Died: 1295 CE; Cairo, Mamluk Sultanate
- Era: Islamic Golden Age
- Region: Iraq
- Main interest(s): Qur'an, Hadith, Aqeedah, Fiqh, Algebra
- Notable work: Nihayat al-Mubtadi'in
- Occupation: Scholar of Islam, Judge

Religious life
- Religion: Islam
- Denomination: Sunni
- Jurisprudence: Hanbali
- Creed: Athari

Muslim leader
- Influenced by: Fakhr al-Din Ibn Taymiyya [ar], Ibn Qudama, Majd al-Din ibn Taymiyya
- Influenced: Ibn Balban

Abū Abd-Allah Najm al-Dīn Aḥmad bin Ḥamdān bin Shabīb bin Ḥamdān al-Ḥarrānī al-Ḥanbalī (Arabic: أبو عبد الله نجم الدِّين أحمد بن حمدان بن شبيب بن حمدان الحراني الحنبلي) commonly known as Ibn Hamdan—was a Hanbalite Muslim scholar and judge (1206–1295). Ibn Hamdan was born and raised in Harran and later in his life went on trips to Damascus, Aleppo and Jerusalem, later settling in Cairo. Ibn Hamdan was appointed judge in Cairo and he lived there until his death in 1295.

Ibn Hamdan was highly skilled in jurisprudence and is considered one of the Imams of the Hanbali school of jurisprudence. He was also highly knowledgeable in the fields of the Quran, Sunnah, algebra and literature. Ibn Hamdan was also a Mufti and a teacher.

== Theology ==
In his Nihayat al-Mubtadiyyin, Ibn Hamdan records that Ahmad bin Hanbal viewed God as neither a particle (jawhar), nor a body (jism), that he is not subject to any change and does not dwell within his creation. He also records that he viewed God as not located in any specific place nor is he encompassed by boundaries, for he existed eternally without beginning at a time when no places exists, and only subsequently did he create place; God remains exactly as he was before the creation of place. He further records that he believed that God resembles nothing and nothing resembles him, and whoever likens God to creation becomes a disbeliever.

== Teachers ==
Abd-al-Qadir al-Rahawi, Fakhr al-Din ibn Taymiyya^{[α]}, Yousuf al-Sakakini al-Harrani, Abu-Bakr bin Nasir al-Harrani, Sulama bin Sadaqa, Nasih al-Din bin Jumay', Abu-Ali al-Iwqi, Ibn-Sabbah, Ibn-Ghassa, Ibn-Ruzbah, Ibn-Siddiq al-Harrani, Nasih al-Din bin Abi-al-Fahm, Shams al-Din al-Munja, Ibn-Salama al-Najjar, Ibn Khalil, Majd al-Din ibn Taymiyya^{[β]}.

== Students ==
Ibn Abi-Bakr al-Harbi, Sayf al-Din al-Nablusi, Sharaf al-Din al-Dimyati, Sa'd al-Din al-Harthi, Ibn al-Haddad al-Amidi, Zain al-Din bin Habib, Ibn Jubara al-Maqdisi, Ibn Mas'ud al-Harthi, Fath al-Din bin Sayid al-Nas, Qutb al-Din Abd-al-Karim, 'Alam al-Din al-Birzali, Jamal al-Din al-Mizzi, Badr al-Din bin al-Habbal, Sanqar al-Hawashi, Ibn abi-al-Qasim al-Farqi, Ibn abi-al-Haram al-Qalansi.

== Publications ==
- Nihayat al-Mubtadi'in fi Usul al-Deen
- Al-Ri'aya al-Kubra
- Al-Ri'aya al-Sughra
- Sifat al-Mufti wa-al-Mustafti
- Muqaddima fi Usul al-Din
- Jami' al-Funun wa-Salwat al-Mahzun

== Notes ==
^{α} Uncle of Majd al-Din ibn Taymiyya.
^{β} Father of Shihab al-Din ibn Taymiyya, grandfather of Taqi al-Din ibn Taymiyya.
