= Aba Butayn =

18th century Muslim scholar

Abā Buṭayn

Personal life
- Born: 1780 Sudair
- Died: 1865 (aged 84–85) Unaizah; Second Saudi State
- Era: Early modern period (Early Saudi era)
- Region: Najd, Arabian Peninsula
- Main interests: ‘Aqīda (Islamic theology); Fiqh (Islamic jurisprudence)
- Notable work: Kitāb Rasā'il wa Fatāwā Abā Butayn

Religious life
- Religion: Islam
- Denomination: Sunni
- Jurisprudence: Ḥanbalī
- Creed: Atharī

Muslim leader
- Influenced by: Ahmad ibn Hanbal, Ibn Taymiyya, Ibn Qayyim al-Jawziyya, Muhammad ibn Abd al-Wahhab
- Influenced: Ibn Humayd al-Najdi, Saleh al-Fawzan

ʻAbd Allāh ibn ʿAbd al-Raḥman ibn ʿAbd al-ʿAzīz ibn Sulṭān ibn Ḫamīs Abā Buṭayn (Arabic: عَبْدُ اللَّهِ بْنُ عَبْدِ الرَّحْمَنِ بْنِ عَبْدِ الْعَزِيزِ بْنِ سُلْطَانِ بْنِ خَمِيسٍ أَبَا بُطَيْنٍ; 1780–1865) known simply as Abā Buṭayn, was a Muslim scholar and jurist, belonging to the Hanbali school of thought. A supporter of the Wahhabi movement, he was a critic of the famous Qasīdat al-Burda poem that is popular amongst Sufis. He was also the great-grandfather of Saleh al-Fawzan, the fourth and current Grand Mufti of Saudi Arabia.

== Biography ==
'Abdullah ibn 'Abd al-Rahman ibn 'Abd al-Aziz ibn Sultan ibn Hamis was born in 1780 in Sudair, an area in the Najd region of the Arabian Peninsula. In adulthood, he travelled to Syria to study religion with his teacher Muhammad ibn Tarad al-Dusari and later he also studied with clerics of the Wahhabi movement. Upon his return to Najd, he was appointed as the Qadi (Islamic judge) by Turki bin Abdullah Al Saud, ruler of the Second Saudi State. Even after Turki bin Abdullah was assassinated, his successors were very close with Aba Butayn and continued to appoint him as a Qadi in the Hijaz. Aba Butayn died in 1865 after his retirement in the city of Unaizah.

Aba Butayn's great-grandson is Salih al-Fawzan on his mother's side, the fourth and current Grand Mufti of Saudi Arabia.

== Support of Wahhabism ==
Aba Butayn was a staunch supporter of Muhammad ibn Abdul Wahhab and the Wahhabi movement, having studied under Wahhabi clerics. He supported the Wahhabis' militaristic campaigns, believing that it was necessary because its opponents were polytheists. Influenced by the Wahhabi views on Sufism, Aba Butayn wrote a two-volume treatise refuting the Qasīdat al-Burda, a popular poem that was written and composed by the scholar al-Busiri.

== Works ==
- Mukhtaṣar Badā'i al-Fawa'id (Treatise on The Wonders of Benefits)
- Al-Intisār lil Ḥanābilah (The Victories of Hanbalis)
- Kitāb Rasā'il wa Fatāwā Abā Butayn (The Collection of Fatwas and Letters of the Hanbali Sheikh of Najd, Aba Butayn)
- Ta'sīs al-taqdīs fī kashf talbīs Dāwūd ibn Jarjīs (The Establishment of the Sacred in Exposing the Deception of Dawud ibn Jarjis)
- Al-Radd ʿalā al-Burda (A Response to the Burda)

== See also ==
- List of Atharis
- List of Hanbalis
