= Al-Nadr ibn Shumayl =

Arab scholar and poet

Abu ʾl-Ḥasan al-Naḍr ibn Shumayl ibn Kharasha al-Māzinī al-Tamīmī (Arabic: أبو الحسن النضر بن شميل بن خرشة المازني التميمي; 740–819/820) was an Arab scholar and poet from central Asia active in Iraq.

Al-Naḍr belonged to the Banū Māzin branch of the Banū Tamīm. He was born in Marw al-Rūdh, but raised in Baṣra, where he spent most of his life. He lived for some years—forty, according to tradition—among the Bedouin, from whom he gained a mastery of Arabic. In Baṣra, al-Naḍr studied ḥadīth, fiqh, grammar, lexicography and the history of the Arabs. He studied under al-Khalīl ibn Aḥmad and wrote an introduction to Khalīl's Kitāb al-ʿAyn. Unable to make a living off his extensive education in Baṣra, he moved to Marw al-Shāhijān. Tradition records that a large number of scholars—700 or even 3,000—went to see him off at the Mirbad in order to persuade him to stay, but when they would not personally guarantee him even an extremely modest living he left. His contemporary, Abū ʿUbayda, included this incident in his book on the mathālib (vices) of the Arabs. In Marw, al-Naḍr became a qāḍī (judge) and helped establish the sunna (Islamic custom) throughout Khorasan. He attended the majlis of al-Maʾmūn, who rewarded him financially for his grammar and poetry.

There are discrepancies over the date of al-Naḍr's death. According to his biographers, he died in the month of Dhu ʾl-Hijja in the year 204 AH (May–June 820), although some sources give the year as 203. According to al-Ṭabarī, he was among the 26 scholars interrogated by Isḥāq ibn Ibrāhīm during al-Maʾmūn's persecution of 833 and one of the 21 sent to Tarsus for refusing to assent to the Muʿtazila doctrine. This may be a case of mistaken identity, given what other sources report of his birth and death.

The lists of al-Naḍr's works recorded by his biographers are long, but none of them is known to have survived. His most important work was the five-volume Kitāb al-ṣifāt fi ʾl-lugha, which is summarised in detail in the Fihrist of Ibn al-Nadīm. It was the first reference work of its kind, a type of encyclopedia or dictionary, in Arabic. It was used by Abū ʿUbayd al-Qāsim ibn Sallām. His other works include Gahrīb al-ḥadīth, Kitāb al-anwāʿ and al-Shams wa ʾl-qamar.

== Bibliography ==
- Brockelmann, Carl (2016). History of the Arabic Written Tradition. Vol. 1. Translated by Joep Lameer. Leiden: Brill.
- Lecker, Michael (1995). "Biographical Notes on Abū 'Ubayda Maʿmar b. al-Muthannā". Studia Islamica. 81 (81): 71–100. doi:10.2307/1596020. JSTOR 1596020.
- Nawas, John Abdallah (2015). Al-Maʾmūn, the Inquisition, and the Quest for Caliphal Authority. Atlanta: Lockwood Press.
- Pellat, Charles (1993). "al-Naḍr b. Shumayl". In Bosworth, C. E.; van Donzel, E.; Heinrichs, W. P. & Pellat, Ch. (eds.). The Encyclopaedia of Islam, Second Edition. Volume VII: Mif–Naz. Leiden: E. J. Brill. p. 873. ISBN 978-90-04-09419-2.
