= Sunan al-Darimi =

Collection of Islamic texts

- Author: Al-Darimi
- Original title: سنن الدارمي
- Language: Arabic
- Genre: Hadith collection
- Publication place: Abbasid Caliphate

Sunan al-Darimi (Arabic: سنن الدارمي) or Musnad al-Darimi (Arabic: مسند الدارمي) by al-Darimi is a hadith collection considered by Sunni Muslims to be among the prominent nine collections: the Al-Kutub al-Sittah, Muwatta Malik, and Musnad Ahmad.

Despite its title as a Musnad, it is not arranged by narrator in the manner of other Musnads, such as that of Tayalisi or Ibn Hanbal. It is arranged by subject matter in the manner of a book of Sunan, like the Sunan Ibn Majah.

== Description ==
It contains approximately 3,833 hadith according to Al-Maktaba Al-Shamela, which are arranged by subject matter. Most of them are considered authentic, with some being weak.

== Conveyance ==
Darimi transmitted these hadiths to `Isa ibn `Umar al-Samarqandi; date of death unknown, but presumably after 293 AH. Thereafter it passed to:

- `Abdullah ibn Ahmad ibn Hamawiya al-Sarkhasi (293–381 AH)
- `Abd al-Rahman ibn Muhammad ibn Muzaffar al-Dawudi "Jamal al-Islam" (374–467 AH)
- Abu'l-Waqt `Abd al-Awwal ibn `Isa ibn Shu`ayb al-Sijizzi (458–553 AH)

== Published editions ==
- Edited by Husayn Salim Asad, Dar al-Maghni, 1420 AH / 2000 CE, p. 151-3
- al-Musnad al-Jami' - Sunan al-Darimi (المُسْنَد الجَامِع المعروف سُنَن الدَّارِمِي) Imam Abi Muhammad al-Darimi, Published: Mu'assassat al-Risalah | Beirut, Lebanon

== See also ==
- List of Sunni books
- Kutub al-Sittah
- Sahih Muslim
- Sahih al-Tirmidhi
- Sunan Abu Dawood
- Either: Sunan ibn Majah, Muwatta Malik
