= Ubayd Allah al-Anbari =

Ubayd Allāh ibn al-Hasan ibn al-Huṣayn al-ʿAnbarī (Arabic: عبيد الله بن الحسن بن الحصين العنبري), simply known as Ubayd Allah al-Anbari (died 168 AH/784–5 AD) was an Arab jurist, poet, lexicographer, genealogist and a governor under the Abbasid Caliphate. He was highly distinguished for coining the popular saying: "kullu mujtahid musib", roughly translated as "every earnest exercise of interpretation results in an acceptable conclusion".

== Life ==
Ubayd Allah al-Anbari was born in Basra between 718/9 and 724/5 AD. He stemmed from a notable Basran family of jurists, belonging to the Arab tribe of Tamim. He was appointed in 773 AD as qadi and governor of Basra by the Abbasid caliph al-Mansur (r. 754–775) succeeding the qadi Sawar ibn Abdallah al-Anbari. As governor he tried to keep his office independent, but he was restricted from pursuing his own policies and was only dependent on Baghdad. Al-Anbari regarded himself as the advocate of the people; while judging a case involving the caliph, he reportedly remained in his seat when the caliph entered the court. In the year 783 AD, under the succeeding caliph al-Mahdi (r. 775–785), al-Anbari was removed from his office as a governor of Basra by the order of the caliph. According to Tarikh Baghdad by al-Khatib al-Baghdadi, al-Anbari was dismissed because he refused an order from the caliph al-Mahdi to find in favor for a military leader against a merchant in a case.

== See also ==
- List of pre-modern Arab scientists and scholars
