= Amr ibn Jarmuz =

7th-century Arab soldier and Murderer of Zubayr ibn al-Awwam

Amr ibn Jarmuz عمرو بن جرموز
- Died: 656
- Criminal charge: Murder
- Penalty: None

Details
- Victims: Zubayr ibn al-Awwam
- Date: November 656
- Killed: 1
- Weapon: Sword

Amr ibn Jurmuz (Arabic: عمرو بن جرموز) was a soldier of caliph Ali, who assassinated Zubayr ibn al-Awwam shortly after the Battle of the Camel, after Zubayr withdrew from the army before the battle began due to a hadith that Caliph Ali ibn Abi Talib had reminded him with regards to what Muhammad had said to Zubayr: “You will rise up in a battle against Ali ibn Abi Talib”.

== Assassination of Zubayr ==
Zubayr ibn al-Awwam was an experienced commander but left shortly after the Battle of the Camel began, without having fought at all, or after Talha was killed, or after single combat with Ammar, according to al-Tabari. Almost all sources introduce Amr ibn Jarmuz as the killer and Wadi al-Siba near Basra as the location of his murder. When the news of his killing reached Ali, he commented that Zubayr had many times fought valiantly in front of Muhammad but that he had come to an evil end. This account is narrated by Marwan and also by Muhammad ibn Ibrahim ibn al-Harith al-Taymi, as reported by the prominent Twelver Shia al-Mufid. This account is preferred by Shias because it suggests that Ali ibn Abi Talib did not forgive Zubayr. According to another account, Ali said that the killer of Zubayr was damned to hell. In another version of this account, Ali adds that Zubayr was a good man, who made mistakes. Then he recites verse 15:47 and expresses hope that it applies to both Talha and Zubayr.

When the head of Zubayr was presented to Ali ibn Abi Talib by Amr ibn Jarmuz, the ruling caliph Ali could not help but to sob and condemn the murder of his cousin crying out, "Prepare to descend to your abode in hell you bedouin. The prophet told me the person who kills az-Zubayr will reside in hell." This reaction caused Amr ibn Jarmuz resentment and, drawing his sword, stabbed it into his own chest.

== Sources ==
- Madelung, Wilferd (1997). The Succession to Muhammad: A Study of the Early Caliphate. Cambridge University Press. ISBN 9780521646963.
- Veccia Vaglieri, L. (2012b). "al-D̲j̲amal". In Bearman, P.; Bianquis, Th.; Bosworth, C.E.; van Donzel, E.; Heinrichs, W.P. (eds.). Encyclopaedia of Islam (Second ed.). doi:10.1163/1573-3912_islam_SIM_1962.
- Shah-Kazemi, Reza (2022). Imam 'Ali: Concise History, Timeless Mystery. I.B. Tauris.
- Bahramian, Ali (2015). "ʿAlī b. Abī Ṭālib 3. Caliphate". In Daftary, Farhad (ed.). Encyclopaedia Islamica. doi:10.1163/1875-9831_isla_COM_0252.
- Khalifa Ali bin Abu Talib - the Battle of the Camel | Alim.org". Archived from the original on 27 September 2013. Retrieved 30 September 2013
- Ayoub, Mahmoud M. (2014). The Crisis of Muslim History: Religion and Politics in Early Islam. Oneworld Publications. ISBN 9781780746746.
