= Capital punishment in Qatar =

Qatar has a dual legal system, consisting of "Islamic courts and civil or adliyya courts," both of which can impose capital punishment. However, the Emir of Qatar has the power to commute sentences.

Under Islamic Sharia law, the death penalty can be imposed for a variety of crimes, such as theft, alcohol consumption and apostasy. However, it does allow for diya, in which a murderer can avoid execution by paying blood money to the victim's family if they consent and accept it.

On the civil side, the Higher Criminal Court can sentence a person to death only by unanimous decision of all three judges and the emir's authorisation. The offences that primarily attract the death penalty are espionage and other threats to national security.

On 22 October 2002, Firas Nassuh Salim Al-Majali, a Jordanian news editor with the Qatar Television network, was condemned to death after being convicted of spying for Jodanian intelligence. However, Jordan managed to persuade then-Emir Hamad bin Khalifa Al Thani to pardon Al-Majali, the son of Nasooh Majali, Jordan's Information Minister and Ambassador to Syria; Al-Majali flew home to Jordan.

Executions are rare; the last occurred in May 2020 after a 17-year hiatus when a Nepali man was executed by firing squad for killing a Qatari.

In October 2023, Qatar sentenced eight Indian former naval officers to death for undisclosed crimes. However, seven were released in December 2023, and the sentence of the eighth, Commander Purnendu Tiwari, was commuted to a 25-year sentence.
