= List of ambassadors of India to Qatar =

Head of mission of India to Qatar

Ambassador of India to Qatar
- Emblem of India

- Flag of India
- Incumbent; Vipul since August 2023
- Style: His Excellency
- Type: Ambassador
- Member of: Indian Foreign Service
- Reports to: Ministry of External Affairs
- Seat: Embassy of India, Doha
- Appointer: President of India
- Term length: No fixed tenure
- Website: Indian Embassy in Qatar

The Ambassador of India to the State of Qatar is the chief diplomatic representative of India to Qatar. The embassy is located in Doha.

The embassy is headed by the Ambassador.

== List of Indian Ambassadors ==
The following people have served as Ambassadors to Qatar.

#	Name	Term start	Term end
1	Arif Qamarain	November 1973	July 1976
2	K. M. Lal	November 1976	April 1980
3	J. S. Doddamani	September 1980	September 1983
4	S. Bashiruddin	October 1983	April 1986
5	S. L. Malik	October 1986	August 1989
6	R. C. Shukla	October 1989	November 1992
7	K. P. Fabian	November 1992	November 1996
8	R. L. Narayan	December 1996	November 2000
9	Ranjan Mathai	August 2001	July 2005
10	George Joseph	October 2005	January 2009
11	Deepa G. Wadhwa	March 2009	June 2012
12	Sanjiv Arora	August 2012	October 2016
13	P. Kumaran	October 2016	July 2020
14	Deepak Mittal	August 2020	March 2023
15	Vipul	August 2023	Incumbent

== See also ==
- India–Qatar relations
