= Ibn Dawud =

Hanbali jurist

Personal life
- Born: Abdullah bin Dawud az-Zubayri Az Zubayr, Basra, Iraq
- Died: 1810 Az Zubayr, Basra, Iraq
- Occupation: Religious scholar, cleric and preacher

Religious life
- Religion: Islam
- Denomination: Sunni
- Jurisprudence: Hanbali
- Creed: Athari

Muslim leader
- Influenced by: Ibn Fayruz
- Influenced: Ahmad Zayni Dahlan

Abdullah bin Dawud al-Zubayri (died 1810), Commonly known as Ibn Dawud, was a Hanbali jurist, religious scholar, imam, and a critic of Wahhabism.

== Biography ==
He was born and raised in al-Zubayr, near Basra, and learned the Qur'an by heart from childhood. When he grew up, he traveled to al-Ahsa and studied under Ibn Fayruz and his son 'Abd al-Wahhab until he became proficient in the fields of fiqh, usul al-fiqh, usul al-din, Arabic language, Islamic inheritance jurisprudence; and then he traveled back to his home country.

== Works ==
- Al-Sawa'iq wa al-Ru'ud fi al-Radd 'ala Ibn Su'ud (The Lightning and Thunder in the Refutation of Ibn Su'ūd)

== See also ==
- Ibn Fayruz
- Sulayman ibn Abd al-Wahhab
