= India–Qatar relations =

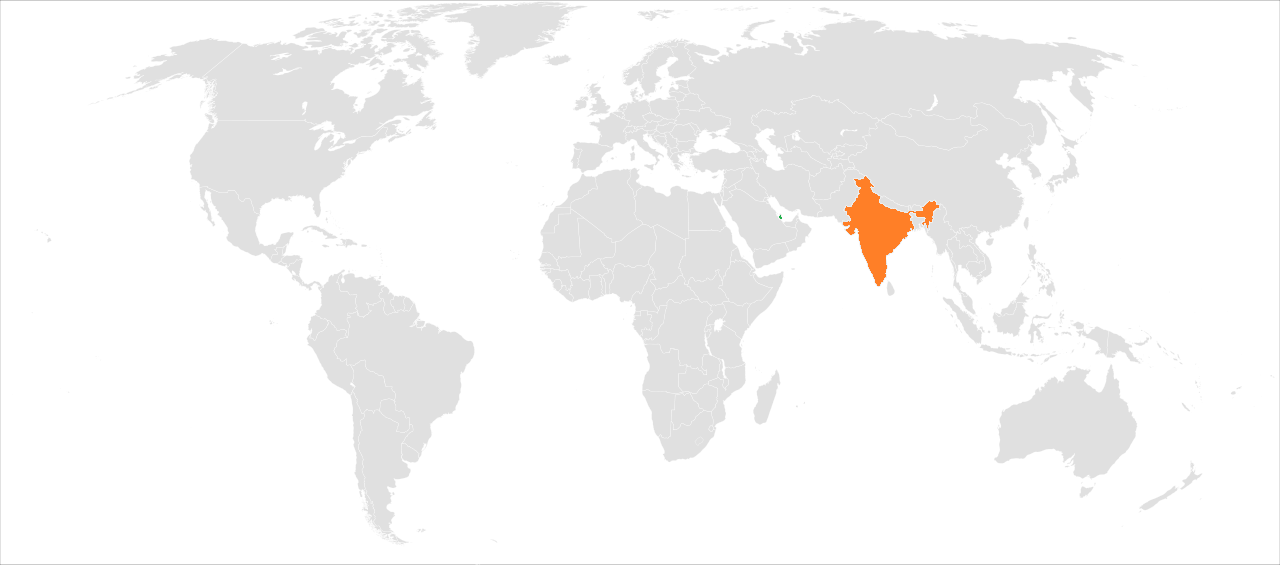

- Qatar: India

Diplomatic mission
- Embassy of India, Doha, Qatar: Embassy of Qatar, New Delhi, India

Envoy
- Ambassador Vipul: Ambassador Mohammed bin Khater Al Khater

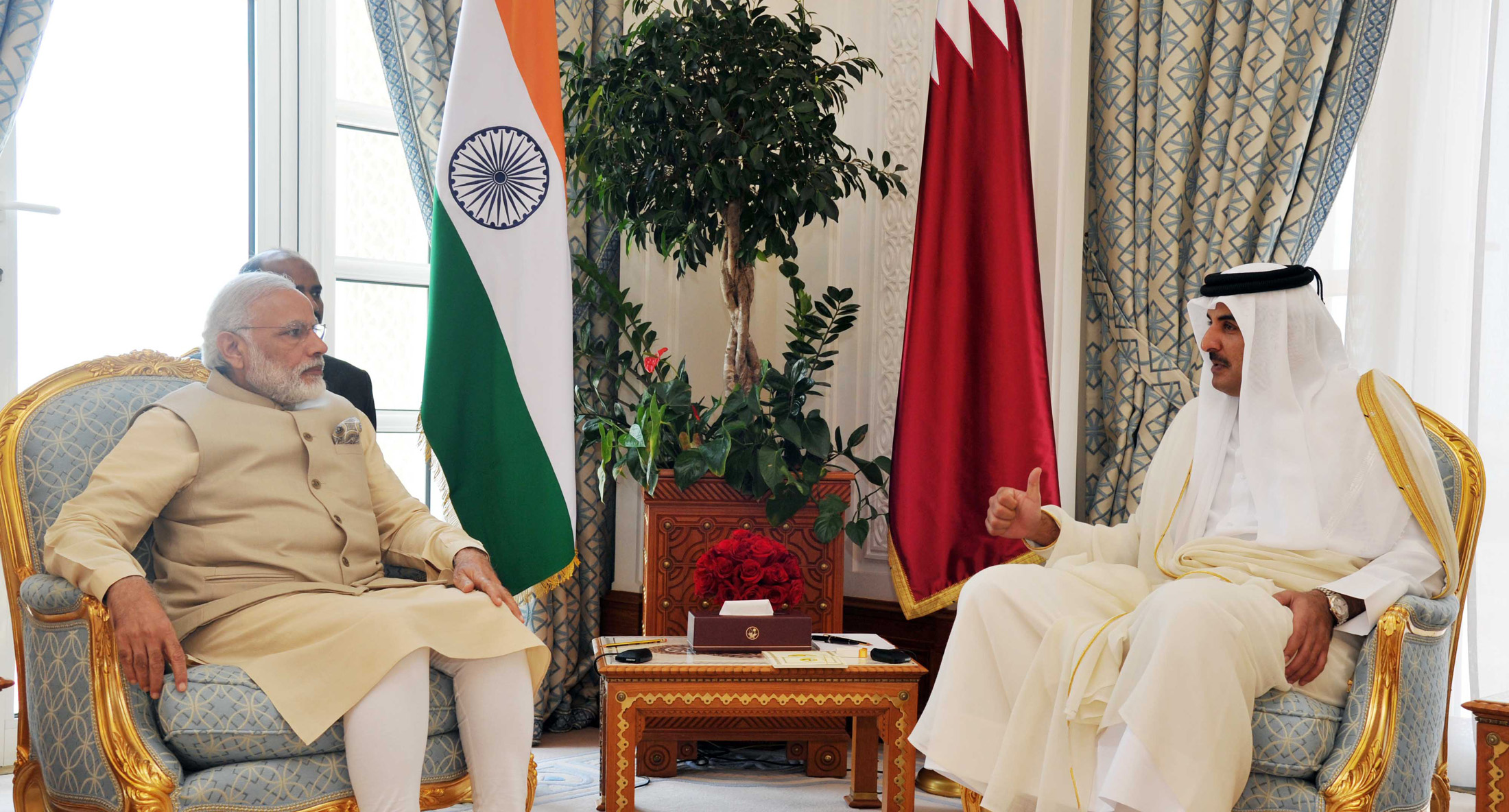
Prime Minister Narendra Modi with Emir Tamim Bin Hamad Al Thani in Doha, June 2016.

India–Qatar relations refers to the bilateral ties between India and Qatar. India maintains an embassy in Doha, while Qatar maintains an embassy in New Delhi and a consulate in Mumbai.

== History ==
Diplomatic relations between India and Qatar were established in 1973.

During a visit made by Emir Tamim bin Hamad al-Thani in March 2015, five MoUs entailing co-operation in several fields were signed. Additionally, an agreement on prisoner repatriation was made. According to this agreement, citizens of India or Qatar who are convicted and sentenced for a crime can be extradited to their native country to spend the remaining years of their prison sentence.

In June 2024, Indian External Affairs Minister S. Jaishankar visited Doha, underscoring the increasing importance of Middle Eastern relations in India's foreign policy. Jaishankar met with Qatar's Prime Minister and Foreign Minister, Sheikh Mohammed bin Abdulrahman bin Jassim Al Thani, to review the bilateral ties. While the Ministry of External Affairs' statement was brief, it highlighted historic and friendly relations, covering a range of topics including trade, investment, energy, and security. This visit followed Jaishankar's trip to the UAE, where India-UAE relations have seen significant growth, evidenced by a trade volume of $83.74 billion in 2023-2024. Qatar and India's relationship is deepening, particularly with the recent $78 billion LNG deal between QatarEnergy and India's Petronet, which is set to save India $6 billion. Despite some complexities, India's strategic engagement with Qatar is bolstered by the significant Indian expatriate population in Qatar, forming about 25% of its populace, primarily as migrant workers.

In July 2026, India observed a day of national mourning as a mark of respect to former Emir of Qatar Hamad bin Khalifa Al Thani.

== Diplomatic visits ==
Emir of Qatar Hamad bin Khalifa al Thani made diplomatic visits to India in April 1999, May 2005 and April 2012.

On 4 June 2016, Prime Minister Narendra Modi arrived in Doha on a two-day visit which was focused on giving a new push to the economic ties, particularly in the hydrocarbon sector. During the visit he shared a meal with Indian workers living in Qatar and also addressed the NRIs at a gala event.

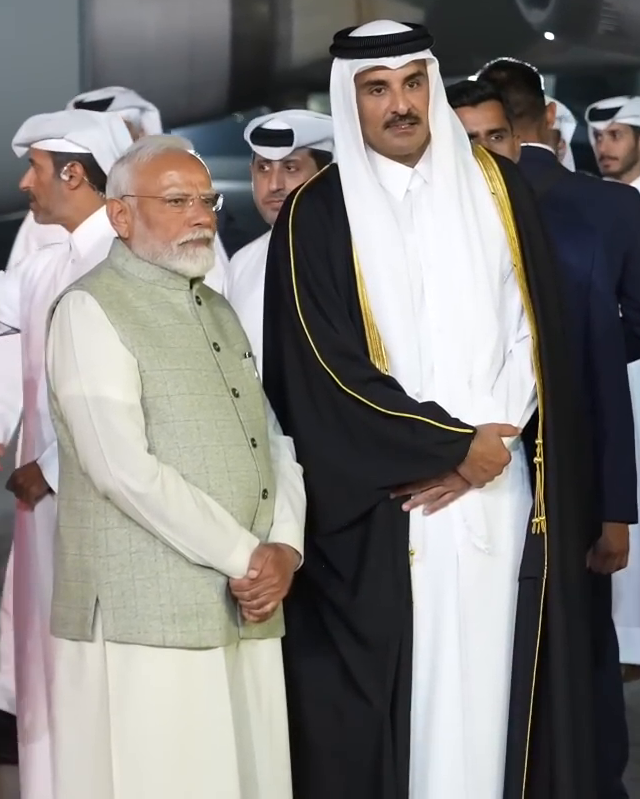
Prime Minister Narendra Modi of India with Emir of Qatar Tamim bin Hamad Al Thani in New Delhi on 17 February 2025

On 17 February 2025, Indian Prime Minister Narendra Modi welcomed Qatari Emir Tamim bin Hamad Al Thani to Delhi, India, to increase and boost trade and economic relations between the two Countries.

== Military relations ==
During the first-ever diplomatic visit to Qatar made by Prime Minister Manmohan Singh of India in November 2008, a maritime defence agreement was approved between the two countries. The agreement was described by Indian government officials as a 'landmark' that would permit mutual maritime defence training and facilitate mutual visits. Indian officials have described the agreement as “just short of stationing troops”. An agreement pertaining to law enforcement and national security was also signed during the meeting. This agreement was made with the intent of exchanging classified information in order to assist in suppressing threats raised by extremist elements. As part of these agreements, the inaugural India-Qatar Joint Committee on Defence Cooperation meeting was hosted in the Qatari capital Doha in 2008. This was followed by a second meeting in New Delhi in 2011 and a third meeting in Doha in 2013.

=== Za’ir-Al-Bahr ===
Za’ir-Al-Bahr (Roar of the Sea) is a joint exercise between the Qatari Emiri Navy and the Indian Navy. Its inaugural edition was conducted during 17–21 November 2019 at Doha. This inaugural edition of the Bilateral Maritime Exercise between the two navies would further strengthen the robust defence co-operation between the two countries, especially in the fight against terrorism, maritime piracy and maritime security.

== Economic relations ==
In 2008, Qatar agreed to invest US$5 billion in India's energy sector. A deep-sea gas pipeline from Qatar to India through Oman has also been proposed.

In January 2016, Qatar agreed to decrease the selling price of gas to India from $12–13 per unit to $6–7 per unit. This deal came as a result of the global reduction in gas prices and the surplus in gas supply worldwide. In addition to reducing the price, Qatar also agreed to exempt India of the ₹12,000 crore (US$1.2 billion) fee that was owed due to India's non-compliance in importing gas shipments which were previously agreed on in 2015.

=== Bilateral trade ===
India amounted to $1.2 billion, or 3.8% of its overall exports in 2014. At a value of $215.3 million, cereals were India's top exported commodity to Qatar. Machinery came second at $108.6 million. The export value for electronic equipment was $93.2 million, making it the third most significant Indian export to Qatar.

Qatari exports to India totaled $16.8 billion, or 12.7% of its overall exports in 2014. The highest valued export commodity is oil, of which $14.9 billion worth has been exported from Qatar to India. Vying for second place is plastics; a recorded $700.8 million worth has been exported to India. The third highest valued Qatari export to India is organic chemicals, accounting for a total of $554 million.

During his June 2016 visit to Qatar, PM Narendra Modi urged Qatari business leaders to invest in India and take advantage of India's investment-friendly policies. He assuaged the concerns of Qatari businessmen and assured them that economic bottlenecks will be resolved in the months ahead.

== Indian diaspora ==
Indian expats are the largest in numbers and make up around 25% of the Qatar population and approx population of Indians in Qatar as of 2023 is around 7.5 Lakh.

== Conflict ==
- Qatar summoned Indian ambassador to protest controversial remarks of Bharatiya Janata Party spokesperson Nupur Sharma and Naveen Kr Jindal on Muhammad. Then BJP suspended Nupur Sharma and expelled Naveen Jindal. Qatar demanded a public apology from India over the remarks.
- Ex-Indian Navy officers espionage in Qatar - In August 2022, eight former Indian naval personnel working for a company called Dahra Global Technologies and Consultancy Services, were arrested in Qatar on suspicion of spying for Israel on Qatar's military submarine program. In October 2023, the eight former officers were given the death sentence, following which India's Ministry of External Affairs expressed shock. Qatar's government declined to comment on the sentences. According to Hindustan Times, an Indian journalist and their spouse were ordered by Qatari authorities to leave the country for reporting on the case. After the death sentences were dropped in December 2023, seven of the eight prisoners were released on 12 February 2024. Seven of the eight men returned to India.
- During the construction for the 2022 Qatar World Cup, many foreign workers were killed.

== See also ==
- Foreign relations of Qatar
- Foreign relations of India
