= Majd ad-Din ibn Taymiyya =

Sunni Islamic scholar (1194–1255)

Majd al-Din ibn Taymiyya

Personal life
- Born: 1194 Harran, Sultanate of Rum (modern-day Turkey)
- Died: 1255 (aged 60–61) Damascus, Mamluk Sultanate (modern-day Syria)
- Region: Islamic Golden Age
- Main interest(s): Hadith, Fiqh, Theology
- Notable work(s): Al-Muntaqa fi Ahadith al-Ahkam, Al-Muharrar fi al-Fiqh

Religious life
- Religion: Islam
- Jurisprudence: Hanbali
- Creed: Athari

Muslim leader
- Influenced by: Ibn Qudama, Ibn Gunaymah
- Influenced: Ibn Taymiyya

Abu al-Barkat Majd al-Din ibn Taymiyya (Arabic: عبد السلام بن عبد الله بن الخضر بن محمد بن تيمية الحراني، أبو البركات مجد الدين) (1194 - 1255) was Muslim scholar muhaddith, traditionalist theologian, judge and Hanbali jurisconsult. He was the father of Shihab al-Din Abd al-Halim ibn Taymiyya [ar] and the grandfather of Taqi al-Din Ahmad Ibn Taymiyya.

He was a reputable scholar of the Hanbali school of law. He had a son: Shihab al-Din Abd al-Halim ibn Taymiyya [ar] (d. 1284) and an uncle: Fakhr al-Din ibn Taymiyya (d. 1225) [ar].

== Biography ==
He was born in Harran in 590 AH. Harran was a city part of the Sultanate of Rum, now Harran is a small city on the border of Syria and Turkey, currently in Şanlıurfa province. At the beginning of the Islamic period, Harran was located in the land of the Mudar tribe (Diyar Mudar). Before its destruction by the Mongols, Harran was also well known since the early days of Islam for its Hanbali school and tradition, to which Ibn Taymiyya's family belonged.

He taught Hadith in the Levant, the Hijaz, and Iraq, and in addition to his country Harran in the Levant, he was a member of his time in the knowledge of the Hanbali school of thought. He was a disciple of ibn Gunaymah & Ibn Qudamah. He is known as ‘al-Majd’ in madhhab. In Hanbali fiqh, the designation ‘ash-Shaykhain” indicates to Imam ibn Qudamah and Imam Majd-ud-din Ibn Taymiyya.

== Books ==
His notable works includes:

1. An explanation of “al-Hidayah”

2. “Al-Muntaqa fi Ahadith Al-Ahkam” was explained by Al-Shawkani titled ‘Nayl al-Awtar’

3. “Al-Muharrar fi Al-Fiqh”, which is more important in terms of the Hanbali jurisprudence- explained by many scholars including his grandson Ibn Taymiyya- his explanation's title was ‘At-Taliq al-Mukarrar’, ibn Rajab and Ibn Abdul-Haq.
