= Gol-e Khatr =

Gol-e Khatr گلخاطر
- Village
- Location within Iran
- Coordinates: 34°31′41″N 45°50′20″E
- Country: Iran
- Province: Kermanshah
- County: Sarpol-e Zahab
- Bakhsh: Central
- Rural District: Howmeh-ye Sarpol

Population (2006)
  - Total: 32
- Time zone: UTC+3:30 (IRST)
  - Summer (DST): UTC+4:30 (IRDT)

Gol-e Khatr (Persian: گلخاطر, also Romanized as Gol-e Khāţr and Gol Khāţer; also known as Gol-e Khāţū') is a village in Howmeh-ye Sarpol Rural District, in the Central District of Sarpol-e Zahab County, Kermanshah Province, Iran. At the 2006 census, its population was 32, in 6 families.
