= Ibn al-Imad al-Hanbali =

Syrian Muslim historian and faqih

- ابن العماد الحنبلي

Personal life
- Born: 1032 AH (1622/1623 CE) Al-Salihiyya, Damascus, Syria
- Died: 1089 AH (1678/1679 CE) Mecca

Religious life
- Religion: Islam
- Denomination: Sunni
- Jurisprudence: Hanbali
- Creed: Athari
- Movement: Sufism

Ibn al-ʿImād (Arabic: إبن العماد) (1623-1679), full name ʿAbd al-Ḥayy bin Aḥmad bin Muḥammad ibn al-ʿImād al-ʿAkarī al-Ḥanbalī Abū al-Falāḥ (Arabic: عبد الحي بن أحمد بن محمد ابن العماد العكري الحنبلي أبو الفلاح), was a Syrian Muslim historian and faqih of the Hanbali school.

== Life ==
Born in the Al-Salihiyah quarter of Damascus, he lived in Cairo for a long period, where he studied under Sultan al-Mazzahi, Nur al-Din Shabramallasi, Shihab al-Din al-Qalyubi, and others, before returning to Damascus to teach. His students included Muhammad ibn Fadlallah al-Muhibbi and Mustafa al-Hamawi. Ibn al-ʿImad died while undertaking the Hajj and was buried in Mecca. He was primarily known for his lengthy biographical dictionary Shadharāt al-dhahab fī akhbār man dhahab ("Fragments of Gold in the Accounts of Those Who Have Departed"), completed in 1670, and covers the first ten centuries of Islamic history. It focuses on providing detailed obituary notices and is an important source in Islamic studies.

The percentage of scholars from each major region of the Islamic world in 25 Hijri year intervals from 91-616 (709-1219 CE), based upon Shadharat al-Dhahab of Ibn al-Imad al-Hanbali. 'Other' includes Arabia, Spain, Maghreb and Anatolia. View source data.

== Works ==
- Shadharāt al-dhahab fī akhbār man dhahab (شذرات الذهب في أخبار من ذهب); (Al-Qāhira, Maktaba al-Qudsī, 1931-1932)
- Sharḥ matn al-muntahá fī fiqh al-Ḥanābilah
- Sharḥ badīʿiyyat Ibn Ḥijjah
