= Givad Khater =

Givad Khater گيودختر
- Village
- Country: Iran
- Province: Kerman
- County: Faryab
- Bakhsh: Central
- Rural District: Hur

Population (2006)
  - Total: 106
- Time zone: UTC+3:30 (IRST)
  - Summer (DST): UTC+4:30 (IRDT)

Givad Khater (Persian: گيودختر, also romanized as Gīvad Khater) is a village in Hur Rural District, in the Central District of Faryab County, Kerman Province, Iran. At the 2006 census, its population was 106, in 24 families.
