= Al Mahmood =

Al Mahmoud (Arabic: ال محمود) is a Sunni Arab family based in Qatar, UAE from the tribe of Banu Tamim from (Arabic: ال معاضيد) them and Al Thani.. whom migrated from najd Hotat Bani Tamim.
