= Mosque of Zubayr ibn al-Awwam =

Mosque in Basra, Iraq

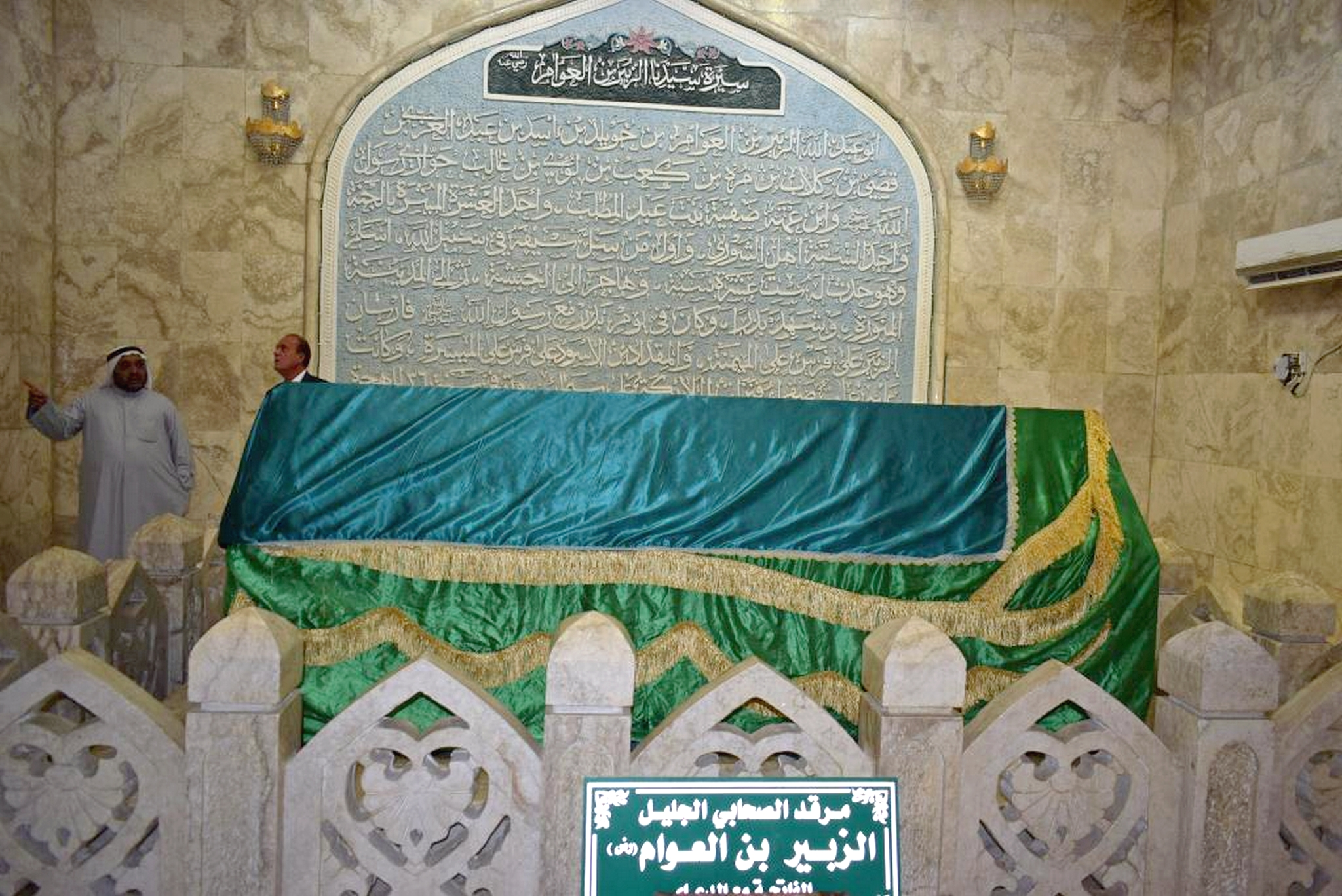
- The tomb of Zubayr ibn al-Awwam in 2018, inside the mosque

- Location of the complex in Iraq

Religion
- Affiliation: Islam
- Ecclesiastical or organizational status: Mosque; Mausoleum; Shrine
- Status: Active

Location
- Location: Az-Zubayr, near Basra, Basra Governorate
- Country: Iraq
- Interactive map of Mosque of Zubayr ibn al-Awwam
- Coordinates: 30°23′55″N 47°41′24″E

Architecture
- Shrines: Two: Zubayr ibn al-Awwam; Utba ibn Ghazwan

The Mosque of Zubayr ibn al-Awwam is a mosque, mausoleum and shrine complex, located in the city of Az-Zubayr, south of Basra, in the Basra Governorate of Iraq. The mosque is believed to contain the tombs of Zubayr ibn al-Awwam and Utba ibn Ghazwan and was founded in 386 AH.

== See also ==
- List of mosques in Iraq
- Islam in Iraq
