= Al-Buainain =

The Al-Buainain (Arabic: آل بو عينين; also spelled Al Bu'ainain, Al Bu'aynin and Al Boainain) are a clan of the Bani Tamim tribe, and are divided into four main branches which are al-Khater, al-Muhammad, al-Ali and Al-Nuwasir. The clan is based primarily in Eastern Province of Saudi Arabia, Qatar, United Arab Emirates and Bahrain. The tribe used to be involved in the lucrative pearl diving industry.

The Al-Buainain tribe was one of several Bedouin tribes to move to Bahrain in 1783, after the Al Khalifa conquered the island.

== History ==
The Al-Buainain established the town of Jubail on the Hasa coast –northwest of Ras Tanura– following dissatisfaction in Qatar. They have also worked on building up one of Qatar's largest cities, Al Wakrah. J. G. Lorimer noted in his publication Gazetteer of the Persian Gulf that the Al-Buainain population in Al Wakrah was 2,000 in 1908. In the same publication, Lorimer reported that the tribe owned around 95 houses in Bahrain, mainly in the towns of Askar and Muharraq.
