= Tamim ibn Murr =

Arabian tribal chieftain

Tamim ibn Murr (Arabic: تميم بن مر) was an Arabian tribal chieftain who lived in pre-Islamic Arabia. He is the ancestor of the Banu Tamim tribe. Tamim ibn Murr was also the caretaker of the Kaaba in Mecca, a role which was passed on to his son 'Amr after his death.

== Genealogy and family ==
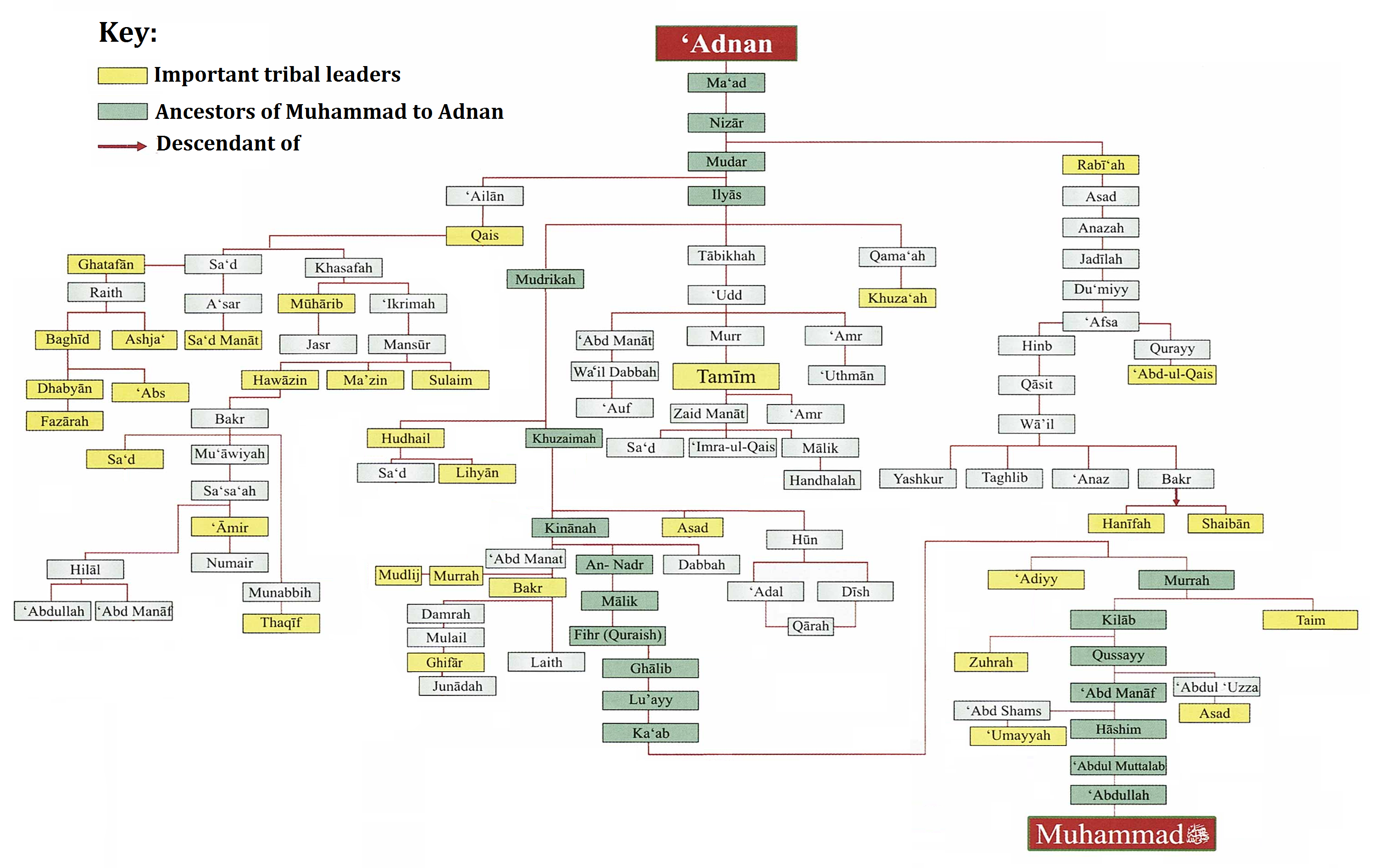
A family tree of Adnan and his descendants, all the way until Muhammad. Tamim and his tribe are also seen in this chart.

Traditionally, his lineage of birth is Tamim, son of Murr, son of 'Udd, son of 'Amr, son of Ilyas, son of Mudar, the son of Nizar, the son of Ma'ad, the son of Adnan. He is also described as being a descendant of Ishmael, hence making him a descendant of the biblical patriarch Abraham.

=== Children ===
Tamim married a woman from the Banu Dabbah tribe who bore him four sons:

- 'Amr ibn Tamim
- al-Harith ibn Tamim
- Yarbu' ibn Tamim
- Zayd Manat, who would be the ancestor of Banu Hanzala

== Religion ==
According to the Zaydi Shi'a scholar Al-Mansur Abdullah, Tamim ibn Murr met with Jesus and became an adherent to Christianity. Other narrations, however, say that Tamim was one of the Disciples of Jesus.

== Notable descendants ==
=== Pre-Islamic Period ===
- Alqama al-Fahl, a rival of Imru' al-Qays

=== Early Islamic era ===
- Khabbab ibn al-Aratt, an early convert to Islam
- Ahnaf ibn Qais, a military commander who served under the Rashidun Caliphate

=== Islamic Golden Age ===
- Abu Abdullah Muhammad bin Sa'id al-Tamimi, a physician who lived in Palestine in the 10th century CE
- Muhammed ibn Umail al-Tamimi, a 10th-century Andalusian alchemist
- Ibn Ishaq al-Tamimi al-Tunisi, a 13th-century alchemist and astronomer from Tunisia

=== Modern period ===
- Muhammad ibn Abd al-Wahhab (d. 1790), an 18th-century Muslim scholar and religious reformer
- Abdul-Rahman al-Sa'di (d. 1957), a Muslim cleric and scholar who wrote his own Tafsir of the Qur'an
- Abdulaziz Al Sheikh, the current Grand Mufti of Saudi Arabia and the head of the Council of Senior Religious Scholars

== See also ==
- Banu Tamim
