= Ibn al-Mundhir =

10th century Islamic legal scholar

Abu Bakr Muhammad ibn Ibrahim ibn al-Mundhir al-Naysaburi

Personal life
- Born: 855 CE (241 AH) Nishapur
- Died: 930 CE (318 AH) Mecca

Religious life
- Religion: Islam
- Denomination: Sunni
- Jurisprudence: ijtihad (Note: before reaching the level of ijtihad)(influences Shafi'i)
- Creed: Athari

Abu Bakr Muhammad ibn Ibrahim ibn al-Mundhir al-Naysaburi (Arabic: أبو بكر محمد بن إبراهيم بن المنذر بن الجارود النيسابوري) was a student of Shafi'i scholar al-Rabi' ibn Sulayman who was in turn a direct student of al-Shafi'i. He would later reach the level of ijtihad, but with little exception ascribe to the legal opinions of al-Shafi'i.
