= Banu Hanzala =

Historical Arab tribe

Banu Hanzala بنو حنظلة
- Adnanites Arabs
- Banner of Banu Hanzala
- Ethnicity: Arab
- Nisba: Al-Hanzali الحنظلي
- Descended from: Hanzala ibn Malik ibn Zayd Manat ibn Tamim
- Parent tribe: Tamim
- Branches: Banu Darim, Banu Yarbu', Tahiuh, Barajim
- Religion: Christianity, later Islam

Banu Hanzala ibn Malik (Arabic: بنو حنظلة) is a historical Arab tribe that inhabited al-Yamama in the Arabian Peninsula. It is a branch of the larger Banu Tamim tribe.

== Ancestry ==
According to Arabic genealogical works, the Banu Hanzala tribe is recorded as descended from Hanzala ibn Malik ibn Zayd Manat ibn Tamim ibn Murr ibn 'Id ibn Amr ibn Ilyas ibn Mudar ibn Nizar ibn Ma'ad ibn Adnan. And Hanzala had eight sons: Malik, Yarbu', Rabi'a, 'Amr, Murra, Ghalib, Kalfa and Qays.

The sub-clans of Banu Hanzala are:

- Banu Darim
- Banu Yarbu'
- Banu Tahiuh
- Barajim

== History ==
Banu Hanzala is mentioned by Yaqut in the battle of Yawm Dhi Najab, one of the Ayyam al-Arab battles. The battle was fought between Banu Amir with the help of Kindite king Akil al-Murar against Banu Hanzala. The Banu Amir marched in great numbers, and the two sides clashed in a place called Najba. Banu Hanzala came out victorious. The Kindite king Akil al-Murar was killed in the battle while many important figures of Banu Amir have been taken captive.

== Notable members ==
- Ishaq ibn Rahwayh
- Muhammad ibn Abd al-Wahhab
- Al-Aqra' ibn Habis
- Ya'la ibn Umayya
- Khazim ibn Khuzayma al-Tamimi
- Al ash-Sheikh
- House of Al Thani
- Muhammad ibn al-Uthaymin
- Al-Darimi

== See also ==
- Pre-Islamic Arabia
- Tribes of Arabia
- Jahiliyyah
