= Mohammed bin Khater Al Khater =

Qatari diplomat

H.E Mohammed Bin Khater Al-Khater is a Qatari diplomat serving as the current Qatar's ambassador to India. He is also a former Qatari ambassador to Indonesia.
