= Banu Tamim =

Arab tribe

Banū Tamīm بَنُو تَمِيم
- Khindifite Arab tribe
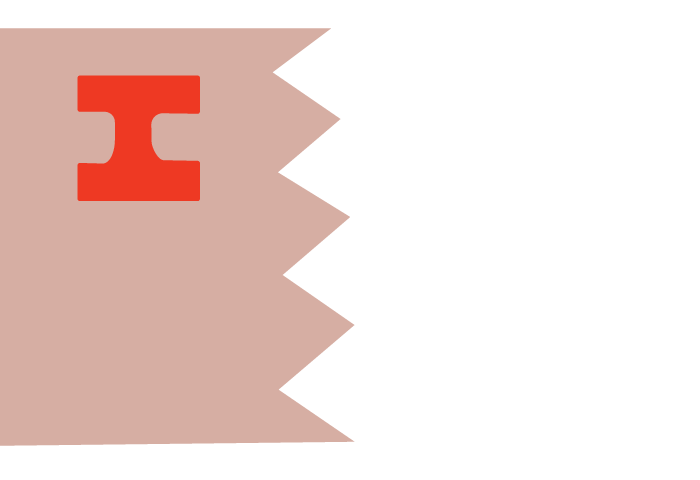
- The Banner of Banu Sa'd ibn Zayd Manat of Banu Tamim in the Battle of Siffin
- Ethnicity: Arab
- Nisba: Al-Tamīmī ٱلتَّمِيمِيّ
- Location: Arabia, North Africa, and Levant
- Descended from: Tamim ibn Murr, the son of Murr ibn 'Udd ibn Amr (Tabikhah) ibn Ilyas ibn Mudar ibn Nizar ibn Ma'add ibn Adnan
- Parent tribe: Banu Mudar
- Branches: Banu Amr; Banu Anbar; Banu Usayd; Banu Asad; Banu Malik; Banu Harith; Banu Qalib; Banu Sa'd; Banu Kab; Banu Amr; Banu Harith; Banu Malik; Banu Awafa; Banu Jashm; Banu Abd Shams; Banu Hanzala; Banu Malik; Banu Yarbu'; Banu Haram; Banu Rabi'a; Banu Amr; Banu Marah; Banu Ghalib; Banu Kulfa; Banu Qays; Banu Rabbab; Banu Uday; Banu Tim; Banu Tawr; Banu Awf; Banu Dabba
- Language: Arabic
- Religion: Islam
- Surnames: Al Tamimi; Al Thani; Al Mahmood; Al Anbari; Al Yahya; Al Awadhi; Al Rashed; Al Wahibi

Map of the Arabian Peninsula in 600 AD, showing the various Arab tribes and their areas of settlement. The Lakhmids (yellow) formed an Arab monarchy as clients of the Sasanian Empire, while the Ghassanids (red) formed an Arab monarchy as clients of the Roman Empire A map published by the British academic Harold Dixon during World War I, showing the presence of the Arab tribes in West Asia, 1914

The Banū Tamīm (Arabic: بَنُو تَمِيم) is an Arab tribe that originated in Najd and Hejaz in the Arabian Peninsula. They are mainly present in Saudi Arabia, Qatar, the UAE, Kuwait, Iraq, Oman, Jordan and Lebanon, and have a strong presence in Algeria, and Morocco, Palestine, Tunisia, and Libya. They are also present in many other parts of the Middle East and North Africa region such as Egypt and Khuzestan in Iran. The word Tamim in Arabic means strong and solid. It can also mean those who strive for perfection.

== History and origin ==
The traditional family tree of the Banu Tamim is as follows: Tamim ibn Murr ibn 'Udd ibn Amr ibn Ilyas ibn Mudar bin Nizar bin Ma'add bin Adnan - a direct descendant of Isma'il bin Ibrahim (Ishmael, son of Abraham).

The Banu Tamim are one of the largest tribes of Arabia. The tribe occupied numerous Wadis and villages in central and eastern Arabia in the 6th century before playing an important role in the beginning of Islam. They came into contact with Muhammad in the 8th year of Hijrah. There are hadiths which praise virtually all of the major Arab tribal groups.

I have continued to love Banu Tamim after I heard three things concerning them from Allah's Messenger: "They will be the sternest of my Ummah against the Dajjal," one of them was a captive owned by Aisha, and he said: "Free her, for she is a descendant of Ismail," and when their zakat came, he said: "This is the zakat of our people," or "of my people.""

— Abu Hurairah

== Lineage and branches ==
The Banu Tamim are an Adnanite tribe, descended from Adnan.

In the genealogical tradition of the tribe, it is argued that there is a direct line that can be drawn from Abraham to Tamim:

- Abraham
- Ishmael
- Adnan
- Ma'add
- Nizar
- Mudar
- Ilyas
- Amr (Tabikhah)
- 'Ud
- Murr
- Tamim

The tribe is mainly divided into four main branches, namely:

- Amr
- Banu Hanzala
- Banu Sa'd
- Al-Rabbab

The tribe was mainly concentrated in the central and northern parts of Najd before the spread of Islam, but had spread across the Arabian Peninsula after the Islamic conquest of the region, then spread to areas ruled by subsequent caliphates.

The tribe extends west to Morocco and east to Khuzestan. After the Islamic conquests, the tribe migrated to modern-day Tunisia, Iraq, Morocco, the Khuzestan and Khorasan regions of Iran, and other parts of the Arab world. The Banu Tamim held significant power for centuries in these areas, in the form of the Aghlabids and other minor dynasties.

== Dynasties ==
- Aghlabids – ruling dynasty of Ifriqiya (modern-day Tunisia, Algeria, and Libya) from 800 to 909 which also controlled parts of southern Italy and Sicily.
- Al Thani – ruling dynasty of Qatar since 1847.
- Al ash-Sheikh – family of the Grand Muftis of the Emirate of Diriyah, then the Emirate of Najd and now modern-day Saudi Arabia for religious matters.
- Al Khater – family of the Middle East based primarily in Qatar, Saudi Arabia, and Bahrain.
- Al Majali – family based in Al-Karak in modern-day Jordan since the 1770s.
- Al Mu'ammar – ruling dynasty of Najd based in Al-'Uyaynah from the seventeenth to the eighteenth century, their lineage goes back to the Anaqir of Banu Tamim.

== Notable people ==
Medieval and pre-Islamic:

- Hurqus ibn Zuhayr as-Sa'di – Known as "Dhu al-Khuwaysira", the first Kharijite.
- Khabbab ibn al-Aratt – a companion of Muhammad
- Ahnaf ibn Qais – companion of Umar ibn al-Khattab
- Al-Qa'qa'a ibn Amr at-Tamimi – A Rashidun general, participated in both the conquest of the Levant and the Sassanid Iran.
- Al-Hurr ibn Yazid al Tamimi – A general of the Umayyads who defected to Husayn ibn Ali
- Abu Al Fazal Abdul Wahid Yemeni Tamimi – Muslim saint who belonged to the Junaidia order
- Abd-Allah ibn Ibadh al-Tamimi – Founder of the Ibadi sect
- Alqama al-Fahl - Pre-Islamic poet, renown for being one of the famous contributors to the Mu'allaqat, rival to Imru' al-Qais
- Jarīr – Classical Arab poet and rival of Al-Farazdaq
- Al-Farazdaq – Umayyad Classical poet, rival of Jarir
- Abu Mansur al-Baghdadi – Shafi'i scholar and mathematician from Baghdad
- Musa ibn Ka'b al-Tamimi – provincial Abbasid Governor in mid 8th century
- Muhammed ibn Umail al-Tamimi – tenth century alchemist from Al-Andalus
- Abu Abdullah Muhammad bin Sa'id al-Tamimi – physician in Palestine during the 10th century CE
- Ibn Ishaq al-Tamimi al-Tunisi – 13th century Tunisian astronomer and the author of an important zij
- Yahya ibn Aktham – Chief judge of the Abbasid Caliphate
- Aktham ibn Sayfi – pre-Islamic figure known as "Judge of the Arabs"
- Khazim ibn Khuzayma al-Tamimi – Khurasani Arab military leader, Abbasid Revolutionary
- Ibrahim I ibn al-Aghlab – founder of the Aghlabids' vassal, the emirs of Ifriqiya and Sicily from 800 to 909
- Munzir ibn Sawa Al Tamimi – ruler of eastern parts of archaic Arabian peninsula who converted to Islam
- Qatari ibn al-Fuja'a – Kharjite leader and poet who led an uprising against the Umayyads from Persia
- Rebi’i bin Aamer Al-Tamimi – Companion of the Prophet of Islam Muhammad.
- Munzir ibn Sawa Al-Tamimi – Governor of historical Bahrain, the eastern coast of the Arabian peninsula
- Ishaq ibn Rahwayh – jurist and imam of Khorasan – One of the Lisan Al-Arab
- Tabikha ibn Ilyas – tribal leader
- Ubayd Allah al-Anbari – Arab jurist, poet, lexicographer, genealogist and governor of Basra under the Abbasids
- Al-Nadr ibn Shumayl – Arab scholar and poet
- Sheikh Edebali – Sufi Master who served in the foundation of the Ottoman Empire and father-in-law of its founder Osman I

Modern Era:

- Muhammad ibn Abd al-Wahhab – founder of Nejdi Salafi movement and author of Kitāb at-Tawḥīd
- Jassim bin Mohammed Al Thani – founder of the State of Qatar
- Muhammad Ibn al 'Uthaymīn (d. 2001 C.E.) – Saudi Salafi preacher
- Abdul-Rahman al-Sa'di – Saudi Islamic Scholar
- Abdulaziz Al Sheikh – former Grand Mufti of Saudi Arabia
- Tamim bin Hamad Al Thani – Emir of Qatar
- Mohammad bin Ibrahim Al-Awadhi – Kuwaiti Islamic preacher
- Ali Abdullah Al-Daffa – Saudi mathematician, scientist, author, professor
