= Al-Harith ibn Awf =

Companion of the prophet Muhammad

al-Ḥārith ibn ʿAwf
- الحارث بن عوف
- Died: , after c. 630 CE; Arabian Peninsula
- Known for: Stopping the war of Dahis and al-Ghabra and being one of Muhammad's companions

al-Ḥārith ibn ʿAwf (Arabic: الحارث بن عوف) was a nobleman from the Banu Murra who lived in pre-Islamic Arabia and later converted to Islam in the 7th century. He was involved in reconciling the Banu Abs and Banu Dhubyan tribes thus ending the 40-year war of Dahis and al-Ghabra.

== Biography ==
His full lineage is stated as al-Harith, son of 'Awf, son of Abi Haritha, son of Murra, son of Nusayba, son of Ghayz, son of Murra, son of 'Awf, son of Sa'd, son of Dhubyan; hence he is from the tribe of Banu Murra and subsequently, part of the Banu Dhubyan. The lineage of Dhubyan ibn Bagheeth has been traced back to Qays and then to Adnan. Genealogists, however, differed on Adnan's lineage while agreeing he was a descendant of Ishmael, hence al-Harith was considered to indeed be an Ishmaelite but with uncertain lineage. (Note: Mubarakpuri states, "It was said that whenever Prophet Muhammad spoke of his ancestry, he would stop at Adnan and say: "Genealogists tell lies" and did not go further than him. A group of scholars, however, favoured the probability of going beyond 'Adnan, considering the aforementioned Hadith to be inauthentic. They went on to say that there were exactly forty fathers between 'Adnan and Abraham.")

== Life ==
=== Before Islam ===
al-Harith ibn 'Awf worked as a nobleman and a merchant. He proposed in marriage to a woman named Buhaysa, who felt that al-Harith was incompetent but still married him anyways. al-Harith would accepted the wisdom of Buhaysa, and later under instruction from her, he and his companion Kharija ibn Sinan (or Harim ibn Sinan (Note: The narratives, although similar, dispute whether it was Harim or Kharija. In Shaqawi's narrative, it is Kharija; but in the narrative of Nicholson, it is Harim. Both Harim and Kharija are from the same father and are known with the patronymic, "Ibn Sinan" however.)) reconciled the tribes of Banu Abs and Banu Dhubyan who had been fighting for forty years in the Dahis and al-Ghabra conflict. Both men counted the dead from each tribe and paid the blood money for all of the deceased. This ended the forty-year conflict between both Adnanite tribes of the Ghatafan.

=== After Islam ===
al-Harith ibn 'Awf led a delegation of the Banu Murra to Medina, meeting with the Islamic prophet Muhammad and then converting to Islam afterwards along with the rest of the delegation. al-Harith requested Muhammad to send a man from the Ansar to preach Islam to the rest of his tribe, which was accepted. However, the Ansari was killed by treachery from the other members of Banu Murra, which al-Harith had no control of. The poet Hassan ibn Thabit began to satirize al-Harith in his poetry, which prompted al-Harith to ask Muhammad to tell Hassan to stop. al-Harith also paid the full blood money payment for the Ansari and gave an apology which the Muslims accepted.

== See also ==
- List of Sahabah
