= Battle of Shi'b Jabala =

The Battle of Shi'b Jabala (Arabic: يوم شعب جبلة) was one of the major, inter-tribal battles of the pre-Islamic period in Najd (central Arabia). It was fought in the late 6th century CE between the Qaysi tribes of Hawazin and Banu Abs on the one hand, and a coalition of the Tamim and Asad tribes and the contingents of the Kindite and Lakhmid kings on the other. It ended in a major victory for the Qays led by the chiefs of the Banu Amir, a branch of the Hawazin. The battle was a major contributor to the evacuation of the last Kindite kings from Najd to South Arabia. The Banu Amir suffered a reversal in fortunes the following year when many of its prominent members fell in a battle with the Tamim.

== Background ==
Before the mid-6th century, the tribes of Najd (central and northern Arabia), generally grouped together under the Qays confederacy, had been under the sway of the Kindite kings. As Kindite dominance faded around the mid-6th century, the Qays came under the supremacy of Zuhayr ibn Jadhima of the Banu Abs, who had the support of the Lakhmid kings of al-Hira in Iraq. The Abs were a clan of the Ghatafan, which, together with the Hawazin, accounted for most of the Qays. Zuhayr's rule was considered oppressive by the Hawazin, moving one of its chiefs, Khalid ibn Ja'far, to assassinate Zuhayr. Khalid thereafter became the head of the Hawazin, which separated from the Qaysi confederacy, and gained the Lakhmids' favor.

At an uncertain point after the Hawazin's break with Ghatafan, Khalid led a raid against the Banu Murra clan of Ghatafan, in which its chief Zalim was slain. The latter's son, al-Harith, later traded insults with Khalid in the court of al-Hira, prompting al-Harith to assassinate Khalid while he was asleep in his tent. Khalid's killing took place in the 560s. Al-Harith gained protection from part of the Tamim led by Laqit ibn Zurara, provoking the ire of the Banu Amir, the leading branch of the Hawazin to which Khalid belonged. Khalid's brother and successor, al-Ahwas ibn Ja'far, led an attack against al-Harith and his Tamimi protectors. In the ensuing battle of Rahrahan, the Banu Amir captured Laqit's brother, Ma'bad, who soon after died of starvation in captivity.

== Dating ==
The battle is traditionally dated to 551, 553 or more commonly to 570, though the historian Clifford Edmund Bosworth holds that it most likely occurred during the reign of al-Mundhir IV's son and successor, al-Nu'man III (r. 582–602), and Werner Caskel dates it to c. 580. Al-Rahrahan preceded Shi'b Jabala by about one year.

== Battle ==
Laqit moved to avenge the death of his brother and gathered a coalition of the Banu Tamim, the Banu Dhubyan of Ghatafan and the Banu Asad. In addition, contingents from the Banu al-Jawn, the Kindite rulers of Bahrayn, and the Lakhmid king al-Mundhir IV (r. 575–580) also joined the coalition. The Lakhmid force was led by al-Nu'man's brother Hassan, while the Kindites were led by the princes Mu'awiya and Amr.

Laqit's coalition attacked the Banu Amir at an isolated mountain pass in their territory, called Shi'b Jabala, 150 kilometers (93 mi) south of Unaizah in the Najd. There, the Banu Amir under al-Ahwas and the Banu Abs under Zuhayr ibn Jadhima's son, Qays, had positioned themselves amid the pass' natural defenses. Qays ibn Zuhayr had devised a strategy of depriving his men's camels so that the camels would move with vigor in pursuit of water. When Laqit's forces assaulted the Amir–Abs tribesmen, the cameleers launched a sortie against them, followed by an attack by men on foot and ending with a final sortie by Amir and Abs horsemen. The latter, led by al-Ahwas, achieved a decisive victory. Laqit, who is held to have fought bravely, and one of the Kindite princes were slain. Among the Amir's fatalities were Zuhayr ibn Amr ibn Mu'awiya.

Shi'b Jabala was one of the three most famous ayyām ('battle days') of the pre-Islamic Arabs, (Note: In general the ayyām battles of pre-Islamic Arabia were skirmishes ending in relatively few casualties, and whose importance were exaggerated in Arabic poetry.) and the historian Franz Krenkow called it "the most remarkable deed recorded of the Kilāb", which was the branch of the Banu Amir which provided its overall chiefs. The battle is alternatively called yawm al-Jawnnayn (the day of the two men of al-Jawn) in reference to the two Kindite princes who fought in the battle and who distributed to the allied tribes their banners. It weakened Kindite power in northern Arabia and led to the eventual Kindite withdrawal to the Hadramawt.

== Aftermath ==
About one year after Shi'b Jabala, the Banu Amir, led by the Kilabi chiefs, allied with a Kindite price from Yemen, Hassan ibn Kabsha, to eliminate the Darim, the branch of the Tamim that opposed the Banu Amir at Shi'b Jabala, and seize their lands and livestock. The Darim had prior knowledge of the planned raid and withdrew into the Wadi al-Rummah, placing before them another branch of the Tamim called the Yarbu. The Yarbu, an especially warlike clan of the Tamim, had not been present at Shi'b Jabala and thus did not incur the casualties of its Tamimi kinsmen. During the subsequent clash between the two sides, known as the Day of Dhu Najab, the Yarbu killed Ibn Kabsha and killed or wounded several Kilabi chiefs, including Yazid ibn al-Sa'iq, al-Ahwas's son Amr, and al-Ahwas's nephew Abida (or Ubayda) ibn Malik.

== Bibliography ==
- Bosworth, C. E., ed. (1999). The History of al-Ṭabarī, Volume V: The Sāsānids, the Byzantines, the Lakhmids, and Yemen. SUNY Series in Near Eastern Studies. Albany, New York: State University of New York Press. ISBN 978-0-7914-4355-2.
- Caskel, Werner (1966). Ğamharat an-nasab: Das genealogische Werk des His̆ām ibn Muḥammad al-Kalbī, Volume II (in German). Leiden: Brill.
- Fresnel, Fulgence (October 1837). "Letters on the History of the Arabs before Islamism". The Foreign Quarterly Review. 20.
- Lyall, Charles (1913). The Diwans of ʿAbīd ibn al-Abraṣ, of Asad, and ʿĀmir ibn aṭ-Ṭufail, of ʿĀmir ibn Ṣaʿṣaʿah. Leiden: Brill. ISBN 9781616405397.
- Lyall, Charles (1918). The Mufaḍḍalīyāt: An Anthology of Ancient Arabian Odes, Volume 2. Oxford: Clarendon Press.
- Krenkow, F. (1993) [1927]. "Kilāb b. Rabīʿa". The Encyclopædia of Islam: A Dictionary of the Geography, Ethnography and Biography of the Muhammadan Peoples, Volume IV: ʿItk-Kwaṭṭa (Reprint ed.). Leiden, New York and Koln: Brill. p. 1005. ISBN 9004082654.
- Meyer, Egber (1970). Der historische Gehalt der Aiyām al-'Arab (in German). Wiesbaden: Otto Harrassowitz. ISBN 9783447012706.
- Shahid, Irfan (1997). "Shi'b Jabala". In Bosworth, C. E.; van Donzel, E.; Heinrichs, W. P. & Lecomte, G. (eds.). The Encyclopaedia of Islam, Second Edition. Volume IX: San–Sze. Leiden: E. J. Brill. pp. 424–425. ISBN 978-90-04-10422-8.
