= Qays ibn Zuhayr =

Tribal chief of the Banu Abs (died 631 CE)

- قيس بن زهير
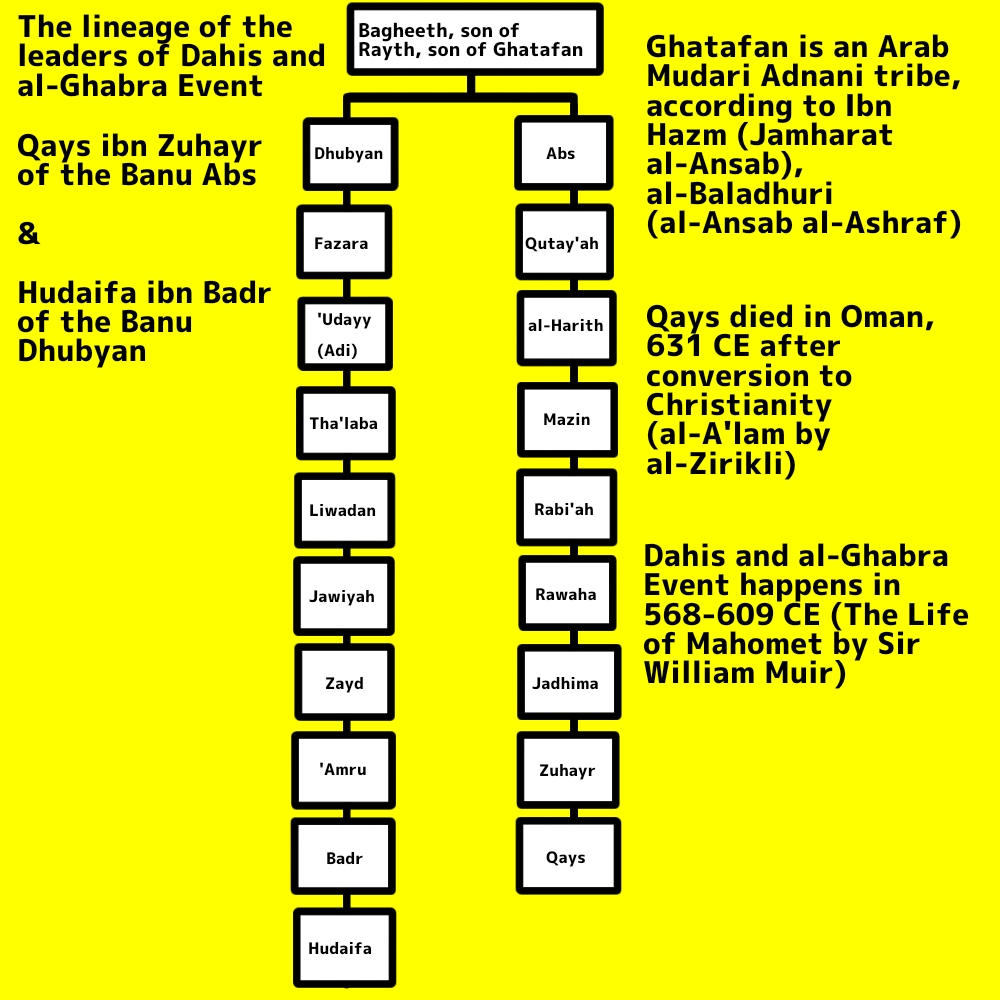
- Family tree of Qays ibn Zuhayr and his rival, Hudhayfah ibn Badr
- Died: c. 631 CE; Oman
- Other names: Abu Hind
- Known for: Fighting on the side of the Banu Abs in the war of Dahis and al-Ghabra
- Title: Qays ar-Ra'i
- Opponent: Hudhayfah ibn Badr
- Parents: Zuhayr ibn Jadhima (father); Tumadur bint al-Sharid (mother)
- Relatives: Malik ibn Zuhayr (brother)
- Family: Banu Abs, Ghatafan

Qays ibn Zuhayr (Arabic: قيس بن زهير) also known as Abu Hind was a tribal chief of the Banu Abs tribe. He fought against the tribe of Banu Dhubyan in the 6th-century war of Dahis and al-Ghabra. Qays converted to Christianity in his final years and then emigrated to Oman where he stayed for the rest of his life.

== Biography ==
=== Family ===
Qays was the son of Zuhayr ibn Jadhima, the former chieftain of the Ghatafan tribal confederation. The full lineage of Qays' father has been stated as Zuhayr, son of Jadhima, son of Rawaha, son of Rabi'a, son of Mazin, son of al-Harith, son of Qutay'a, son of Abs; this traces the lineage of Qays back to the progenitor of the Banu Abs tribe. His mother was Tumadur bint al-Sharid, while his brother was Malik ibn Zuhayr.

=== Leadership ===
Qays became the tribal chief of the Banu Abs, succeeding his father. He is best known during this era for leading his tribe against the Banu Dhubyan in the 40-year war of Dahis and al-Ghabra which started partly due to Qays' brother Malik getting stabbed to death by Dhubyani chief Hudhayfah ibn Badr as retaliation for his own brother being stabbed to death by the Banu Abs; all of this occurred in the first place due to Ibn Badr refusing to pay the Banu Abs their deserved prize of camels as they had won a horse bet against the Banu Dhubyan. Qays successfully killed Ibn Badr in the ensuing battles as well.

Qays ibn Zuhayr also guarded the caravans of Lakhmid ruler Al-Nu'man III ibn al-Mundhir whenever they entered Al Yamama, which gave him special gifts and privileges from Al-Nu'man himself.

=== Final years and death ===
Qays ibn Zuhayr eventually agreed to stop fighting against the Banu Dhubyan as the blood money for his brother had been paid off by two noblemen from a neighboring tribe. He would later become an ascetic in his final years and then emigrate to Oman where he lived the rest of his life in seclusion until he died in 631 CE (10 AH in the Islamic calendar). Qays had also converted to Christianity during his final years.

== Personality ==
Aside from being known as a cunning and courageous tribal chief and warrior amongst the pre-Islamic Arabs, Qays was a famed poet. He received the title "ar-Ra'i" due to the decisions he made, which the pre-Islamic Arabs favoured. Some also narrated that he was wise and gave frequent sermons to his people.

== See also ==
- Zuhayr ibn Jadhima
- Kulaib ibn Rabiah
