= Banu Tha'labah =

Banu Tha'labah was a tribe during the Islamic prophet Muhammad's era. They were involved in many military conflicts with Muhammad.

== Origin and etymology ==
The Banu Tha'labah, who were Ghatafanis, were adherents of Christianity who fought Muhammad. They were descended from Tha'labah ibn Dhubyān ibn Baghīd ibn Rayth ibn Ghaṭafān ibn Saʾd ibn Qays (ibn?) ʿAylān ibn Mudar ibn Nizar ibn Ma'ad ibn Adnan.

This tribe belonged to the Adnanite Arabs (who came from Adnan), who in turn belonged to the Tha'labah tribal group, whose (the latter's) members are called "Thalabis". They come (as does the name "Tha'labah") from their traditional eponymous ancestor ultimately, Tha'labah, the ancestor of a clan of Ismailites from whom Adnan descended.

This Banu Tha'labah should not be confused with another tribe of the same name but whose members were Muhajirun. They descended from Tha'labah ibn Yarbu ibn Hanzala ibn Malik ibn Zayd Manat ibn Tamim ibn Murr ibn 'Id ibn Tabikhah (Amr) ibn Ilyas ibn Mudar ibn Nizar ibn Ma'ad ibn Adnan.

== Conflict with Muhammad ==
The first conflict they were involved in was the Invasion of Thi Amr. Muhammad ordered a military raid against the Banu Muharib and Banu Talabah tribes after he received intelligence that they were allegedly going to raid the outskirts of Medina.

This was followed by the First Raid on Banu Thalabah in August 627. Muhammad ordered an attack on the Banu Thalabah tribe, because he suspected they would be tempted to steal his camels, during this raid 9 Muslims were killed.

In the same month he ordered the Second Raid on Banu Thalabah. He ordered his men to attack the Banu Thalabah tribe, as revenge for the 1st failed raid on them in which 9 Muslims died.

The Last military campaign he ordered against them was the Third Raid on Banu Thalabah, in which he told his men to raid Banu Thalabah and capture their camels as booty.

== During Abu Bakr's era ==
After the Ridda Wars against Muslim apostates and after the tribes converted back to Islam (Tabari describes it as entering "once again the gate by which they had gone out") the Banu Tha'labah came to settle in Medina and asked Abu Bakr "why have we been kept camping from our country" and he replied "you lie, it is no land of yours". However he provided the Banu Tha'labah with the al-Rabadhah land for pasturing purposes.

== See also ==
- List of expeditions of Muhammad
