= Banu Ghani =

Former Arabian tribe

Banu Ghani بنو غني
- Qaysite Arab tribe
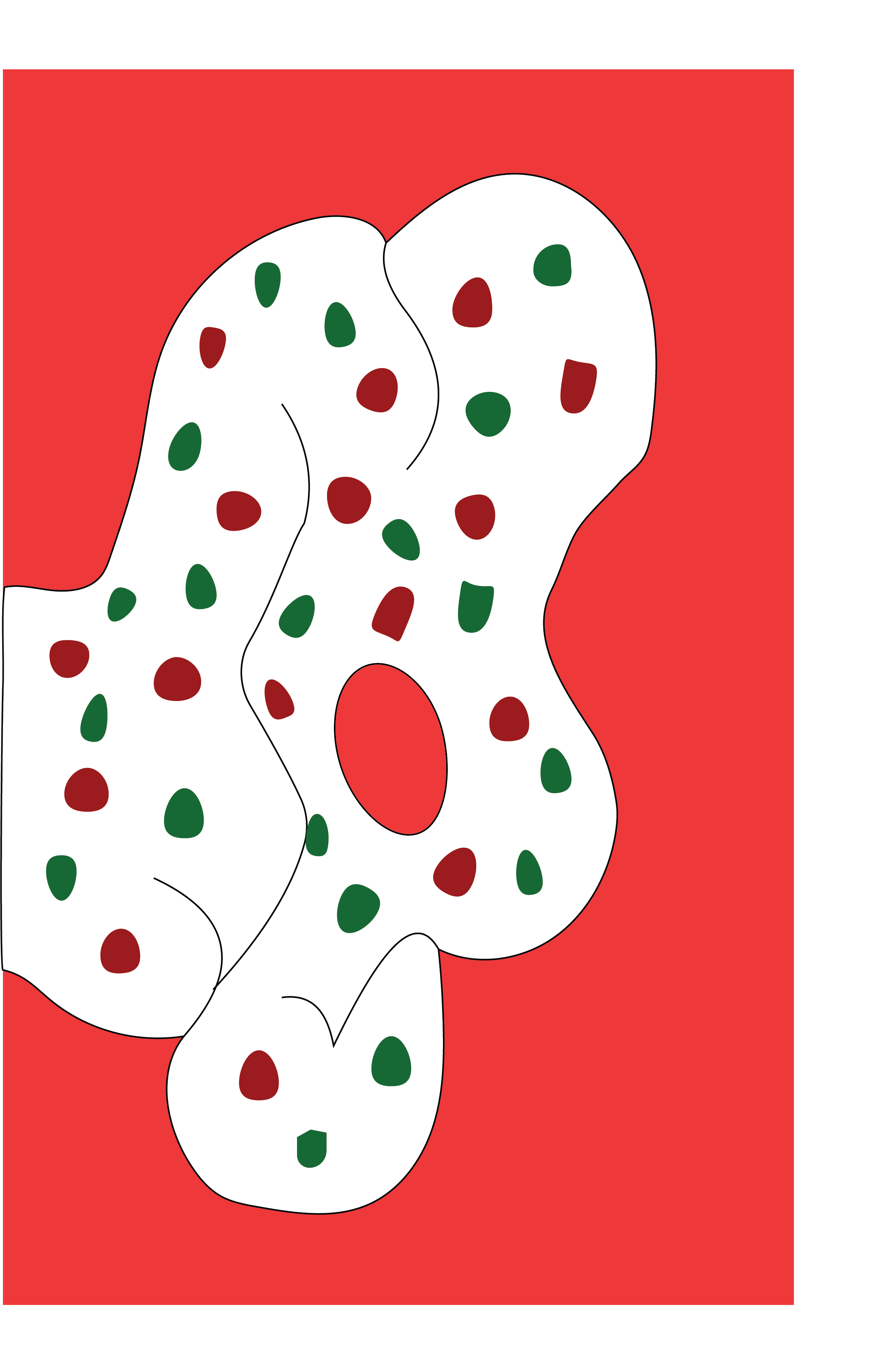
- Banner of Banu Ghani
- Ethnicity: Arab
- Nisba: Al-Ghanawi
- Location: Bisha and Diriyah
- Descended from: Ghanī ibn Aʿṣur
- Religion: Paganism, later Islam

The Banu Ghani (Arabic: بنو غني) was an Arab tribe that inhabited the area between Bisha and Diriyah in pre-Islamic Arabia and parts of which migrated to Syria during the Muslim conquest of that region.

== History ==
=== Origins ===
According to Arab genealogical tradition, the progenitor of the Banu Ghani was a certain Ghanī ibn Aʿṣur ibn Sʿad ibn Qays ʿAylān, making them part of the larger Qays confederation. They were the brothers of the Bahila tribe. Throughout their history, they were a relatively small tribe compared to the other subtribes of Qays.

=== Pre-Islamic era ===
In the mid-6th century a leader of the Banu Ghani, Riyah ibn Ashall, killed the son of the powerful chieftain of the Banu Abs, Zuhayr ibn Jadhima. His daughter was later wed to the founder of the paramount clan of the Banu 'Amir, Ja’far ibn Kilab. From then onward, the Banu Ghani acted as subordinate allies of the Banu Amir, victoriously fighting alongside them at the battle of Shi’b in 580 and the battle of Raqam toward the close of the century. However, they suffered heavy casualties alongside the Banu 'Amir subtribes of Banu Kilab and Banu Ka'b at the hands of the Banu Tayy at the battle of Muhajjar in the early 7th century. They later retaliated against the Tayy.

=== Islamic era ===
Though one member of the tribe, Abu Marthad al-Ghanawi, was an early companion of the Islamic prophet Muhammad, most of the tribe converted after the defeat of the pagan Arab tribes at the Battle of Hunayn in 630. They remained Muslim when many of the converted Arab tribes apostatized during the Ridda wars following Muhammad's death in 632. Many Ghani tribesmen migrated to Syria during the Muslim conquest of the region between 634 and 638. Following the rout of the Qaysi tribes at the Battle of Marj Rahit in 684, the Qaysi–Yamani wars ensued. During the long-running conflict, the Banu Ghani fought alongside their Qaysi kinsmen against the Yamani tribes and the Taghlib.

== Bibliography ==
- Fück, J. W. (1965). "Ghanī b. Aʿṣur". In Lewis, B.; Pellat, Ch. & Schacht, J. (eds.). The Encyclopaedia of Islam, Second Edition. Volume II: C–G. Leiden: E. J. Brill. pp. 1004–1005. OCLC 495469475.
