= Ibn Sinan =

Arab nobleman (died 608)

- ابن سنان
- Died: 608 AD; Arabian Peninsula
- Known for: Stopping the war of Dahis and al-Ghabra

Ibn Sinan (Arabic: ابن سنان) was a nobleman and poet of pre-Islamic Arabia from the Banu Murra tribe. He was also the cousin of al-Harith ibn 'Awf. Together with al-Harith, Ibn Sinan was remembered for his involvement in ending the war of Dahis and al-Ghabra.

== Biography ==
"Ibn Sinan" was only a patronymic; his real name was either Sinan or Kharija. The Muslim scholar Amin ibn 'Abd Allah states that his name was Kharija, while orientalist translator Reynold A. Nicholson states that his name was Harim. The lineage of his father is Sinan, son of Abi Haritha, son of Murra, son of Nusayba, son of Ghayz, son of Murra, son of 'Awf, son of Sa'd, son of Dhubyan. This lineage indicates that Ibn Sinan was from Banu Dhubyan through the Banu Murra division. His cousin was al-Harith ibn 'Awf.

Ibn Sinan had a daughter, who was a Muslim and lived until the rule of the Rashidun caliph Umar ibn al-Khattab.

=== Life ===
Ibn Sinan and al-Harith reconciled the forty-year war of Dahis and al-Ghabra that was fought between the two tribes of Banu Dhubyan and Banu Abs. The two men counted the deceased, and then proceeded to pay the blood money for all of the deaths, ending the war. Sir William Muir dates this reconciliation to around 608 CE. After the tribes had been reconciled, Ibn Sinan went on a business trip to the Al-Hira but died on the way, in the same year.

Zuhayr bin Abi Sulma praised the actions of Ibn Sinan and his cousin in helping to prevent further escalation of the conflict between the Banu Dhubyan and Banu Abs.

== See also ==
- al-Harith ibn 'Awf
