= Expedition of Abu Qatadah ibn Rab'i al-Ansari =

Expedition of Abu Qatadah ibn Rab'i al-Ansari may refer to:

- Expedition of Abu Qatadah ibn Rab'i al-Ansari (Batn Edam), November 629 AD, 8th month of 8AH
- Expedition of Abu Qatadah ibn Rab'i al-Ansari (Khadirah), November 629 AD, 8th month of 8AH
