= Dahis and al-Ghabra =

6th-century armed conflict in pre-Islamic Arabia

Dāhis and al-Ghābra
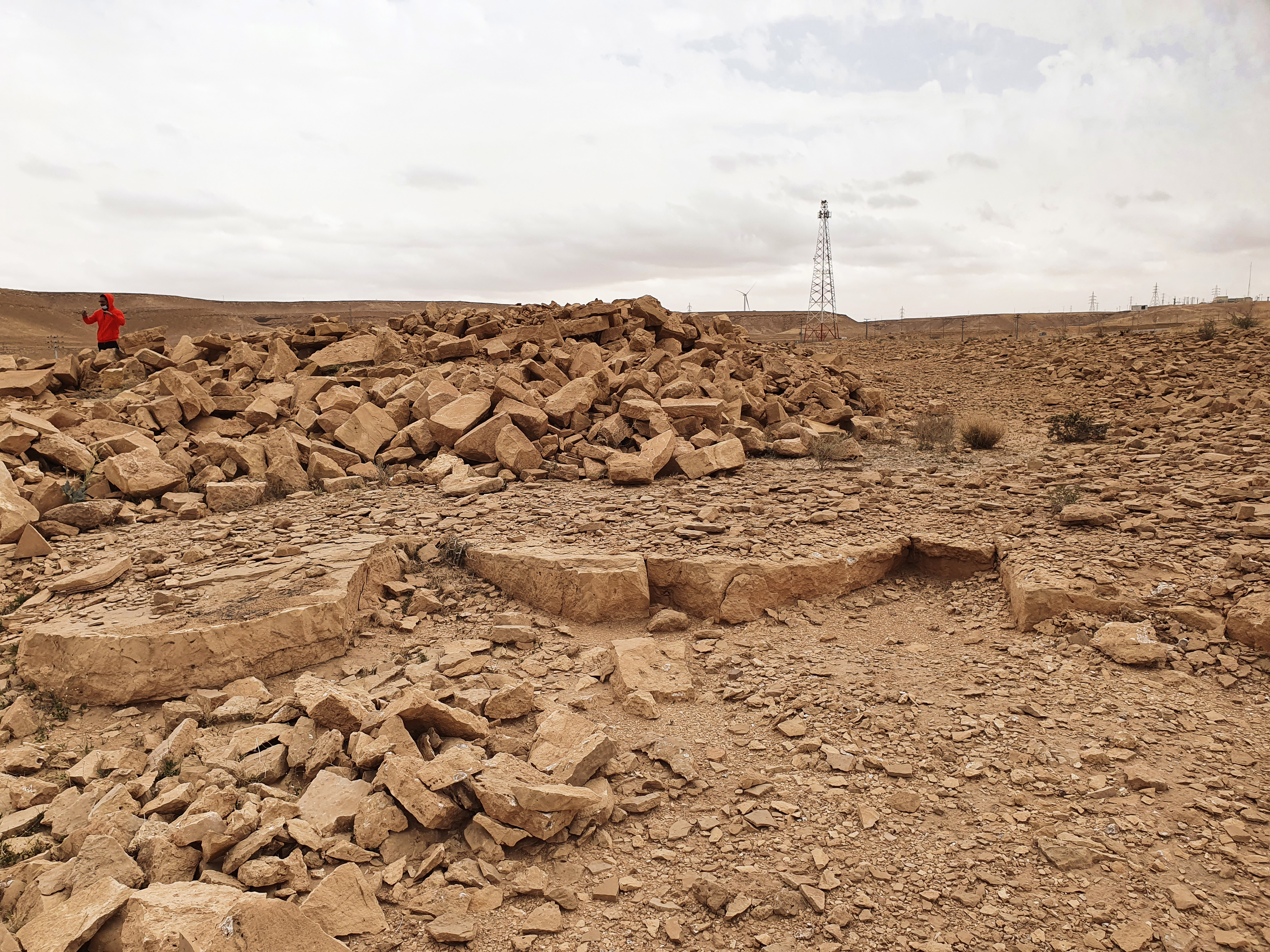
- Purported location of the battles fought by the Abs and the Dhubyan
Date	c. 568–609 CE
Location	Al Yamama
Result	Inconclusive: Truce formed between the two tribes; Blood money paid by external parties

Belligerents
Banu Abs	Banu Dhubyan (supported by the Tayy and Hawazin)

Commanders and leaders
Qays ibn Zuhayr	Hudhayfah ibn Badr

Dāhis and al-Ghābra (Arabic: داحس والغبراء) was an armed conflict between two tribes of the Ghatafan. The conflict started due to a dispute over horse betting and occurred in the 6th century CE.

== Background ==
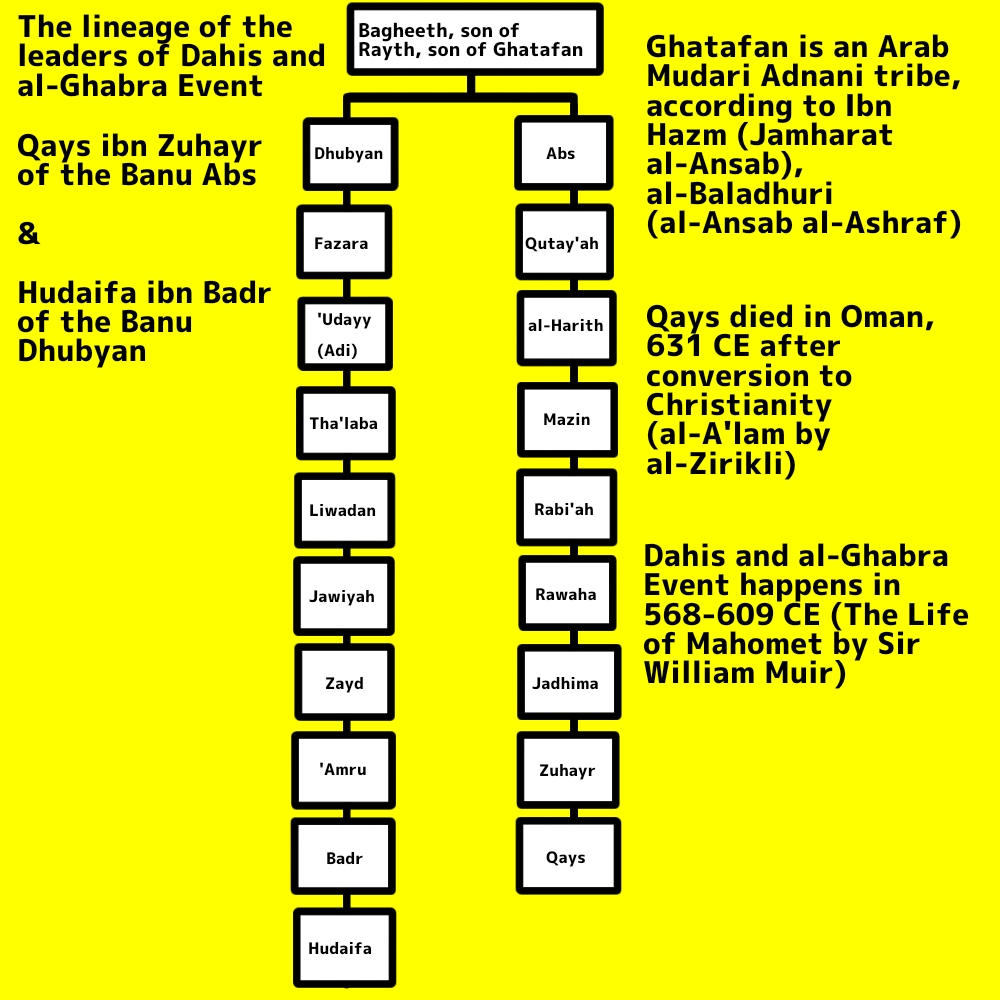
The family tree of the two main leaders during the war of Dahis and al-Ghabra.

The chief of Banu Abs, Qays ibn Zuhayr, had organized a horse betting event with the chief of Banu Dhubyan, Hudhayfah ibn Badr. Qays brought a horse named Dahis, while Hudhayfah brought a horse named al-Ghabra. The winner would receive at least a hundred camels from the rival tribe.

During the race, the Banu Dhubyan sent a few men from their tribe to distract the horse named Dahis. As a result, Dahis slowed down and its rival al-Ghabra was able to win. When the Banu Abs heard about this, they ordered the Banu Dhubyan to pay the hundred camels, as they were the ones who would have won if not for the intervention. But Hudhayfah ibn Badr refused to pay up, and the Banu Abs responded by stabbing his brother to death. Banu Dhubyan retaliated by stabbing the brother of Qays ibn Zuhayr. The stabbings led to a series of bloody violence between the tribes.

== Conflict ==
=== Course of conflict ===
The fighting lasted for approximately forty years. The pre-Islamic poet Antarah ibn Shaddad was one of the fighters in the war, fighting on the side of the Banu Abs. Other Arabian tribes including the Hawazin and the Tayy participated in the conflict on the side of the Banu Dhubyan. More than a hundred people died in the fighting, which included Hudhayfah ibn Badr and Antarah ibn Shaddad.

Some of the Banu Abs, however, refrained from fighting in order to guard the caravans of the Lakhmids that were passing through Al Yamama. The Lakhmid ruler at the time, Al-Nu'man III ibn al-Mundhir, had promised the Banu Abs rewards if they successfully protected his caravans. This led to the envy of the Banu Dhubyan, and further escalated the conflict.

=== End of conflict ===
Two merchants, al-Harith and Ibn Sinan from neighboring tribes intervened and offered to pay the blood money for both the Banu Abs and Banu Dhubyan as well as all the lives of the chiefs that were taken during the conflict. A truce was formed between the Banu Abs and Banu Dhubyan, ending the conflict.

== Time period ==
The conflict happened a few years after the Basus War, which occurred in circa 494–534 CE. This would indicate that the conflict happened in the 6th century. Sir William Muir dates the conflict to take place around 568–609 CE.

== See also ==
- Fijar Wars
- Yawm al-Buath
