= Ka'b ibn Mama =

Ka'b ibn Mama al-Iyadi (Arabic: كعب بن مامة الإيادي) was a pre-Islamic Arab figure proverbial for his munificence, and in particular for "giving water to a companion and himself dying of thirst as result". According to Ibn `Abd Rabbih, he was one of three people who reached the highest point of generosity in the pre-Islamic era, the other two were Hatim al-Tai and Harim ibn Sinan al-Murri.

Kaʻb died of dehydration in one of his travels when he favored his companion, al-Namari (Arabic: النمَّري), over himself for the remaining water they had carried. His story with al-Namari displays a high degree of i'thar (altruism), a trait which the pre-Islamic Arabs regarded with great admiration.

== Story with al-Namari ==
While traveling in the scorching heat of the sun with a company that included a man from al-Namr ibn Qasit, the group ran short of water and decided to split all the water they had carried equally amongst them. Each time the man who served the water turned around the group and reached Kaʻb for his share, Kaʻb's companion, al-Namari, would look upon Kaʻb and stare at him with an appeal for the water, to which Kaʻb responded by telling the server: "Serve your brother al-Namari" (Arabic: اسق أخاك النمري) which later became a classical Arabic proverb. This was done repeatedly until Kaʻb became completely exhausted and weak that the moment they found a well some time later, he wasn't able to move and eventually died of thirst.

== Honorary mentions ==
O Commander of the Faithful! If we take up medicine as our subject, you are Galen incarnate in your familiarity with it; if astrology, you are Hermes [Trismegistos] in your calculations; or if religious knowledge, you are 'Alī ibn-Abī-Ṭālib (God's prayers upon him) in mastering it; or if generosity is mentioned, you are better than Hatim in you liberality; or if we mention true speech, you are Abu-Darr in the truth of your tongue; or if nobility, you are Ka'b Ibn Mama in preferring others over yourself, and if loyalty, you are as-Samaw'al ibn-‘Ādiyā’ in your loyalty.

— Yahya ibn-Aktam (d. 242/856) in addressing al-Ma'mūn, Tayfur's Kitab Baghdad and al-Bayhaqī's al-Maḥāsin wa-l-masāwi’
