= Timeline of early Islamic history =

This is a timeline of the early history of Islam during the lifetime of Muhammad. The information provided in this article is based on Islamic oral tradition, not on historical or archaeological evidence. A separate list of military expeditions and battles is at List of expeditions of Muhammad.

N.	Record, milestone or achievement	Date	Noteworthy facts	Notable primary sources
1.	Muhammad's first revelation: Quran 96:1–5	13 BH (610 CE) Ramadan	According to Islamic tradition, during one such occasion while he was in contemplation, the archangel Gabriel appeared before him in the year 13 BH (610 CE) and said, ‘Recite’, upon which he replied, ‘I am unable to recite’. Thereupon the angel caught hold of him and embraced him heavily. This happened two more time after which the angel commanded Muhammad to recite the following verses:"Proclaim! (or read!) in the name of thy Lord and Cherisher, Who Created man, out of a (mere) clot of congealed blood:Proclaim! And thy Lord is Most Bountiful,- Who taught (the use of) the pen,-Taught man that which he knew not."	Sahih al-Bukhari, 1:1:3
2.	First Muslim Female convert: Khadija	13 BH (610 CE)	When Muhammad reported his first revelation from the Angel Gabriel (Jibril), Khadija was the first female and first person to convert to Islam. However, Shia Muslims claim Ali was the first to convert to Islam.	Ibn Hisham & Ibn Ishaq
3.	First Muslim child convert: Ali Ibn Abi Talib	13 BH (610 CE)	Ali, is said to have supported Muhammed from his childhood and in some texts, is said to have converted to Islam just after his birth. It is sometimes reported that Ali was the second, after Khadija, to embrace Islam amongst the earliest Muslims.: Ali ibn Abi Talib is known among the earliest and youngest Muslim converts. The early historian Ibn Ishaq and al-Tabari puts Ali Muhammad's cousin and son-in-law as the first male convert; Muhammad ibn Jarir al-Tabari presents three candidates, and does not decide between them.; According to one Hadith, Ali was Muhammad's cousin and accepted Islam at the age of 11 making him the first male to accept Islam	Ibn Hisham & Ibn Ishaq; Tabari, Volume 6
4	Earliest Muslim Adult Male converts: Zayd ibn Harithah and Abu Bakr	13 BH (610 CE)	One account in Tabari says that the first male convert was Zayd ibn Harithah, a freed slave who had become Muhammad's adopted son. It is known that Ali was indeed one of the first persons to convert to Islam, however some dispute this arguing he was only 12 years old at the time he embraced Islam.; Later Abu Bakr followed.: Muhammad's prominent companions Hassan ibn Thabit (d. 674), Ibn Abbas (d. 687), and the Kufan scholar al-Nakhai (d. 714) claim Abu Bakr to be the first adult male convert.; Abu Bakr is also said to be one of the first male Muslim convert on accounts preserved by the historian al-Tabari.; Despite the conflicts, when talking about adult males, Abu Bakr was one of the first ones to accept Islam.	al-Tabari & al-Nakhai
5	First Public Dawah	613	Around 613, Muhammad began to preach to the public(Quran 26:214). Most Meccans ignored him and mocked him, though a few became his followers. There were three main groups of early converts to Islam: younger brothers and sons of great merchants; people who had fallen out of the first rank in their tribe or failed to attain it; and the weak, mostly unprotected foreigners.	Ibn Hisham & Ibn Ishaq
6	First Muslim Martyr/first Muslim to be killed: Sumayyah bint Khabbab	615	Tradition records at great length the persecution and ill-treatment towards Muhammad and his followers. Sumayyah bint Khabbab (mother of Ammar ibn Yasir), a slave of a prominent Meccan leader Abu Jahl, is famous as the first martyr of Islam; killed with a spear by her master when she refused to give up her faith.	Ibn Hisham & Ibn Ishaq
7	First Muslim to be tortured: Bilal ibn Ribah	615	When Bilal's master, Umayyah ibn Khalaf found out he had converted to Islam, he began violently to torture Bilal.; With Abu Jahl instigating, Umayyah tied Bilal up and had him dragged around Mecca as a means to break Bilal's faith. Frustrated upon Bilal's refusal to denounce Islam, Umayyah became even more angry. He ordered that Bilal's limbs were to be stretched out and tied to stakes lying flat on desert sand, so that he could feel the intensity of the sun and the Arabian heat. He would be whipped and beaten while tied to the stakes. Constantly refusing to denounce Islam, Umayyah became frustrated and ordered that a large boulder/stone be placed on Bilal's chest. The boulder heated by the sun burned Bilal's body while also crushing him.; After such punishments, news of this slave reached some of Muhammad's companions who told Muhammad of the slave. Muhammad then sent Abu Bakr. Eventually, Abu Bakr negotiated a deal with Umayyah to purchase Bilal and emancipate him from slavery.	Tabari, Volume 6
8	First migration to another country: Ethiopia	615	In 615, some of Muhammad's followers emigrated to the Ethiopian Aksumite Empire and founded a small colony. This was known as the Hijrah	Tabari, Volume 6; Ibn Hisham & Ibn Ishaq
9	First Muslim Ambassador and Envoy: Mus`ab ibn `Umair	September 621	Musab ibn Umair al-Abdari was the first Muslim Ambassador. He was sent to Yathrib (now Medina) to teach the people the doctrines of Islam and give them guidance Note: Author says it happened before the Second pledge at al-Aqabah which happened in 622. Therefore, this event happened in 621	Tabari, Volume 6; Ibn Hisham & Ibn Ishaq
10	First Muslim Muezzin: Bilal ibn Ribah	622	After Muhammad migrated to Medina he appointed Bilal ibn Ribah as the first Muslim Muezzin	Ibn Hisham & Ibn Ishaq; Tabari, Volume 39
11		622		Sahih al-Bukhari, 5:58:229; Ibn Hisham & Ibn Ishaq; Tabari, Volume 6
12		623	According to Ar-Raheeq Al-Makhtum (The Sealed Nectar), a modern Islamic hagiography of Muhammad written by the Indian Muslim author Safi ur-Rahman Mubarakpuri, Muhammad ordered the first caravan raid led by Hamza ibn ‘Abd al-Muttalib (Muhammad's uncle) seven to nine months after the Hijra. A party of thirty to forty men assembled at the seacoast near al-Is, between Mecca and Medina, where Amr ibn Hishām (Abu Jahl), the leader of the caravan was camping with three hundred Meccan riders.; Hamza met Abu Jahl there with a view to attack the caravan, but Majdi bin Amr al-Juhani, a Quraysh who was friendly to both the parties intervened between them; so, both parties separated without fighting.; It is mentioned in Ibn Hisham and Ibn Ishaq's biography of Muhammad (the earliest surviving biography of Muhammad from the 7th century), that for these caravan raids Muhammad gave permission to "plunder" the caravans of theirs enemies and seize their goods and property(s) and said: "Go forth against this caravan; it may be that Allah will grant you plunder"	Ibn Hisham & Ibn Ishaq; Al-Waqidi, Kitab al-Maghazi
13		623	In 623 Muhammad ordered the Batn Rabigh Caravan Raid to raid Quraysh caravan to relieve themselves from poverty Sa'd ibn Abi Waqas was the first person to fire an arrow in the name of Islam, it mentioned in the Sunni hadith collection Sahih al-Bukhari "I heard Sa'd saying, "I was the first amongst the 'Arabs who shot an arrow for Allah's Cause. We used to fight along with the Prophet""Sahih al-Bukhari, 5:57:74	Sahih al-Bukhari, 5:57:74; Ibn Sa'd, Kitab al-tabaqat al-kabir, Volume 2
14	First peace treaty: Banu Darhma peace treaty	August 623	Muhammad ordered the Invasion of Waddan with the purpose of raiding Quraysh caravan to relieve themselves from poverty. However, they instead raided the Caravan of Amr Bin Makhshi Al Dhamri of the Banu Damrah tribe. Negotiations began and the two leaders signed a treaty with Banu Damrah. According to Muslim scholar Muhammad al-Zurqani, the provisions of the treaty were as follows: "This document is from Muhammad, the messenger of Allah, concerning the Banu Darmah, in which he establishes for them safety and security in their wealth and lives. They can expect support from the Muslims, unless they oppose the religion of Allah. They are also expected to respond positively if the prophet seeks their help."; The treaty meant that both parties were forbidden from raiding each other, joining hostile concentrations against each other, and supporting each other's enemies. The historian William Montgomery Watt saw this as a deliberate attempt by Muhammad to provoke the Meccans.	Ibn Sa'd, Kitab al-tabaqat al-kabir, Volume 2
15		January 624		^{[Quran 2:217]}; Ibn Hisham
16	First assassination carried out by Muslims: Asma bint Marwan or Ka'b ibn al-Ashraf	January 624	Muhammad ordered the killing of 'Asma' bint Marwan for opposing Muhammad with poetry and for provoking others to attack him; For those scholar who consider this as unreliable Ka'b ibn al-Ashraf is considered the first person to be assassinated by Muslims	Ibn Hisham & Ibn Ishaq; Ibn Sa'd, Kitab al-tabaqat al-kabir, Volume 2
17	First assassination carried out by Muslims: Ka'b ibn al-Ashraf	September 624	According to Ibn Ishaq, Muhammad ordered his followers to kill Ka'b because he "had gone to Mecca after Badr and inveighed against Muhammad. He also composed verses in which he bewailed the victims of Quraysh who had been killed at Badr. Shortly afterwards he returned to Medina and composed amatory verses of an insulting nature about the Muslim women".	Sahih al-Bukhari, 5:59:369, Sahih Muslim, 19:4436
18	First person(s) to be beheaded and executed by Muslims: Nadr ibn al-Harith and Uqba ibn Abu Mu'ayt	March 624	According to the Muslim scholar Safiur Rahman al-Mubarakpuri, after the Battle of Badr two captives – Nadr bin Harith and ‘Uqbah ibn Abū Mu‘ayṭ were beheaded by Ali. Mubarakpuri mentions that this incident about the beheading is also mentioned in the Sunan Abu Dawud no 2686 and Anwal Ma'bud 3/12 The Muslim scholar Ibn Kathir mentions that ^{[Quran 8:31]} is also about this incident	Sunan Abu Dawud no 2686 and Anwal Ma'bud 3/12; ^{[Quran 8:31]}
19	First Siege carried out by Muslims: Invasion of Banu Qaynuqa	February 624	Muhammad ordered his followers to attack the Banu Qaynuqa Jews for allegedly breaking the treaty known as the Constitution of Medina by pinning the clothes of a Muslim woman, which lead to her being stripped naked; As a result, a Muslim killed a Jew in retaliation, and the Jews in turn killed the Muslim man. This escalated to a chain of revenge killings, and enmity grew between Muslims and the Banu Qaynuqa, leading to the siege of their fortress. The tribe eventually surrendered to Muhammad, who initially wanted to kill the members of Banu Qaynuqa but ultimately yielded to Abdullah ibn Ubayy's insistence and agreed to expel the Qaynuqa.	^{[Quran 8:58]}, ^{[Quran 3:118]}, ^{[Quran 3:12]}, ^{[Quran 3:13]}; Sahih Muslim, 19:4364; Ibn Sa'd, Kitab al-tabaqat al-kabir, Volume 2; Tabari, Volume 7, The foundation of the community
20	First person to try and assassinate Muhammad: Ghwarath ibn al-Harith during the Invasion of Dhi Amr	September 624	Ghwarath ibn al-Harith was the first person to try and assassinate Muhammad during the Invasion of Dhi Amr. According to Muslim scholar Sami Strauch, it is reported in Sahih Bukhari that it was raining, and Muhammad took his garments off and hung it on a tree to dry, while the enemy was watching, Ghwarath ibn al-Harith went to attack Muhammad. He threatened Muhammad with his sword and said "who will protect you from me on this day". Then according to Muslim Scholars the Angel Gabriel came and thumped Ghawrath in the chest and forced him to drop his sword. Muhammad then picked up the sword and said "who will protect you from me".	Sahih al-Bukhari, 5:59:458; Ibn Sa'd, Kitab al-tabaqat al-kabir, Volume 2
21	First defensive military campaign: Battle of Uhud	March 625	The purpose of the Battle of Uhud was to defend against a Quraysh attack. According to the Muslim scholar Dr. Mosab Hawarey, this battle was the first truly defensive military campaign. All military campaigns prior to this were of an offensive nature	^{[Quran 8:36]}, ^{[Quran 3:122]}, ^{[Quran 3:167]}; Sahih al-Bukhari, 4:52:276, Sahih al-Bukhari, 3:30:108
22	First Muslim missionaries to be killed: Asim ibn Thabit, Khubyab bin Adi and Zayd bin al-Dathinnah during the Expedition of Al Raji	625	Some men requested that Muhammad send instructors to teach them Islam, but the men were bribed by the two tribes of Khuzaymah who wanted revenge for the assassination of Khalid bin Sufyan (chief of the Banu Lahyan tribe) by Muhammad's followers. 8 or 10 Muslims were killed; According to William Montgomery Watt the seven men Muhammad sent may have been spies for Muhammad and instructors for Arab tribes. Watt's claim that they were spies and not missionaries is mentioned in the Sunni Hadith collection Sahih al-Bukhari, 5:59:412 The 7th century Muslim scholar al-Waqidi also mentioned that they were spies but a tribe did come to them requesting to teach Islam but Muhammad decided to send them for spying to inform him about the Quraysh.	Sahih al-Bukhari, 5:59:412, Sahih Muslim, 4:1442; Ibn Hisham & Ibn Ishaq; Ibn Sa'd, Kitab al-tabaqat al-kabir, Volume 2
23	First Massacre of Muslims: Expedition of Bir Maona	July 625	Muhammad sends Missionaries at request of some men from the Banu Amir tribe, but the Muslims are killed as revenge for the assassination of Khalid bin Sufyan by Muhammad's followers. 70 Muslims were killed and 2 Non-Muslims were killed	Quran 3:169-173; Ibn Hisham; Sahih al-Bukhari, 5:59:405, Sahih Muslim, 4:1433
24	First massacre carried out by Muslims: Invasion of Banu Qurayza	February–March 627	Banu Qurayza betrayed Muhammad, So he ordered his followers to attack the Banu Qurayza because according to Muslim tradition he had been ordered to do so by the angel Gabriel. Al-Waqidi claims Muhammad had a treaty with the tribe which was torn apart. Stillman and Watt deny the authenticity of al-Waqidi. Al-Waqidi has been frequently criticized by Muslim writers, who claim that he is unreliable.; 600-900 members of the Banu Qurayza were beheaded (Tabari, Ibn Hisham). Another source says all Males and 1 woman beheaded (Sunni Hadith). 2 Muslim's were killed	^{[Quran 33:26]}, Quran 33:09 & 33:10; Sunan Abu Dawood, 38:4390; Sahih al-Bukhari, 4:52:68, Sahih al-Bukhari, 4:57:66 and more; Tabari, Volume 8, Victory of Islam
25	First woman captured by Muhammad as war booty: Rayhana	March 627	After the Invasion of Banu Qurayza as part of his share of the spoils, Muhammad selected one of the women, Rayhana, for himself and took her as part of his booty. Muhammad offered to free and marry her and according to some sources she accepted his proposal. She is said to have later become a Muslim. Watt, "Kurayza, Banu" Encyclopaedia of Islam	Ibn Hisham & Ibn Ishaq
26	First Muslim treasurer: Bilal ibn Ribah	630	Muhammad appointed Bilal ibn Ribah as the first Muslim treasurer after he completed his conquest of the Arabian Peninsula	Tabari, Volume 5

== See also ==
- Historiography of early Islam
- Early social changes under Islam
- List of expeditions of Muhammad
- Timeline of Medina
- Timeline of the history of Islam (7th century)
