= Abu Qatada =

Abu Qatada (Arabic: أبو قتادة, romanized: ʾAbū Qatāda) may refer to:

- Abu Qatada al-Ansari (584–658/660), knight of the Rashidun Caliphate
- Abu Qatada al-Filistini (born 1959), Palestinian Islamic cleric
