= Qays =

Arab tribal confederation

Qays قيس
- Adnanite tribe
- Nisba: Qaysi
- Location: Arabia
- Descended from: Qays ibn Aylan ibn Mudar ibn Nizar
- Parent tribe: Mudar
- Branches: Khasafa; Mansur ibn Ikrima; Hawazin; Banu Sa'd; Otaibah; Sulaym; Ziyad; Muharib; Sa'd; A'sur; Ghani; Al-Tufawa; Ghatafan; Ashja; Dhubyan; Abs; Anmar; Amr; Adwan; Fahm
- Religion: Polytheism (pre-630); Islam (post 630)

Qays ʿAylān (Arabic: قيس عيلان), often referred to simply as Qays (Kais or Ḳays) were an Arab tribal confederation that branched from the Mudar group. The tribe may not have functioned as a unit in pre-Islamic Arabia (before 630). However, by the early Umayyad Caliphate (661-750), its constituent tribes consolidated into one of the main tribal political factions of the caliphate.

The major constituent tribes or tribal groupings of the Qays were the Ghatafan, Hawazin (including Amir and Thaqif), Sulaym, Ghani, Bahila and Muharib. Many of these tribes or their clans migrated from the Arabian Peninsula and established themselves in Jund Qinnasrin, the military district of the northern region of Syria and Upper Mesopotamia, which long became their abode. From there they governed on behalf of the caliphs or rebelled against them. The power of the Qays as a unified group diminished with the rise of the Abbasid Caliphate, which did not derive its military strength solely from the Arab tribes. Nonetheless, individual Qaysi tribes remained a potent force and some migrated to North Africa and al-Andalus, where they carved out their power.

== Name and genealogy ==
The full name of the tribal confederation is Qays ʿAylān or Qays ibn ʿAylān, though it is most frequently referred to simply as Qays; occasionally in Arabic poetry, it is referred to solely as ʿAylān. Members of the Qays are referred to as al-Qaysĭyūn (sing. Qaysī), transliterated in English-language sources as "Qaysites" or "Kaisites". As an ethno-political group, the Qays are referred to in contemporary sources as al-Qaysīyya. Unlike most tribes of Arabia, the sources seldom use the term Banū (literally "sons of") when referring to the descendants of Qays.

Qays is the namesake and progenitor of the confederation, and traditional Arab genealogy holds that the father of Qays was a certain Aylan. According to the traditional genealogists, ʿAylān was the epithet of al-Nās, a son of Mudar ibn Nizar ibn Ma'ad ibn Adnan. The theory that Aylan is the father of Qays is rejected by Ibn Khaldun (d. 1406), a medieval historian of Arab tribes, and is indirectly rejected by other medieval Arab historians. Rather, Ibn Khaldun asserts that "Qays Aylan" is the epithet of al-Nas ibn Mudar ibn Nizar ibn Ma'ad ibn Adnan. These historians hold varying theories as to the origins of the "Aylan" part of the epithet; among these are that Aylan was either the name of al-Nas's famous horse, his dog, his bow, a mountain where he was said to have been born, or a man who raised him.

Qays was one of the two subdivisions of Mudar, the other being the Khindif (also known as al-Yās). As descendants of Mudar, the Qays are considered Adnanites or "North Arabians"; Arab tradition traces the descent of all Arab tribes to either Adnan or Qahtan, father of the "South Arabians". By the dawn of Islam in the mid-7th century, the descendants of Qays were so numerous and so significant a group that the term Qaysī came to refer all North Arabians.

== Branches ==
The Qays consisted of several branches, which were divided into further sub-tribes. The first-tier divisions, i.e. the sons of Qays, were Khasafa, Sa'd and Amr.

=== Khasafa ===
From Khasafa descended the large tribes of Hawazin and Banu Sulaym, both of whose founders were sons of Mansur ibn Ikrima ibn Khasafa, and the Banu Muharib, whose founder was the son of Ziyad ibn Khasafa. The Hawazin was a large tribal grouping that included several large sub-tribes. Among them were the Banu Amir, whose progenitor was Amir ibn Sa'sa' ibn Mu'awiya ibn Bakr ibn Hawazin, and the Thaqif, whose progenitor was Qasi ibn Munabbih ibn Bakr ibn Hawazin. However, references to the Hawazin often excluded the Banu Amir and Thaqif, and were limited to the so-called ʿujz Hawāzin (the rear of Hawazin). The latter included the tribes of Banu Jusham, Banu Nasr and Banu Sa'd, all of whose founders were sons or grandsons of Bakr ibn Hawazin. The Banu Sulaym was divided into three main divisions, Imru' al-Qays, Harith and Tha'laba.

=== Sa'd ===
Sa'd's sons A'sur and Ghatafan each bore several sub-tribes. The largest sub-tribes of A'sur were the Banu Ghani, whose founder was a son of A'sur, and the Banu al-Tufawa, which consisted of the descendants of three other sons of A'sur, Tha'laba, Amir and Mu'awiya, who were half-brothers of Ghani; they were collectively called after their mother, al-Tufawa. The Bahila was the other large sub-tribe of A'sur, and its founders were the sons of a certain Bahila, who, at different times was the wife of two of A'sur's sons, Malik and Ma'n; there were many clans of the Bahila, the largest being the Banu Qutayba and Banu Wa'il. The largest sub-tribes of the Ghatafan were the Banu Dhubyan and Banu Abs, both of whose founders were sons of Baghid ibn Rayth ibn Ghatafan, and the Banu Ashja', whose founder was a son of Rayth ibn Ghatafan. From Banu Dhubyan came the Fazara, whose founder was a son of Dhubyan, and the Banu Murra, whose founder was a son of 'Awf ibn Sa'd ibn Dhubyan.

=== Amr ===
The two main sub-tribes of the Amr branch were the banu Adwan and banu Fahm, both founded by sons of Amr.

== Geographic distribution ==
According to Arab legend, the original homeland of the Qaysi tribes was in the low-lying areas of the Tihamah along the Hejaz (western Arabia). By Muhammad's time (ca. 570 CE), the numerous branches of the Qays had spread to the areas southeast and northeast of Mecca, the region of Medina, other areas in the Hejaz, the highlands of the Najd and the Yamama (both in central Arabia), Bahrayn (eastern Arabia), and parts of Lower Mesopotamia where the Lakhmids ruled. Like other Arabian groups, numerous Qaysi tribes migrated northward during and after the Muslim conquests. Qaysi tribes spread throughout Syria and Mesopotamia, particularly in the northern parts of those regions, in the provinces of Qinnasrin (around Aleppo) and Diyar Mudar. However, they also had a presence around Homs, Damascus, the Ghouta and Hawran plains, the Golan Heights, Palestine, Transjordan (al-Balqa), and in the cities of Kufa and Basra.

By the 14th century, only remnants of the Qaysi tribes still lived in their central Arabian ancestral lands. Huge numbers of Qaysi tribesmen had made their dwelling places throughout North Africa in a series of migratory waves. Among them were the Banu Sulaym in Ifriqiya (central North Africa) and Fes, the Adwan in Ifriqiya, the Fazara and Banu Rawah in Cyrenaica, Tripolitania and Fezzan, the Banu Ashja' in Algeria and Morocco, the Banu Hilal (a sub-tribe of the Banu Amir) in Ifriqiya, Constantine and Annaba and the Banu Jusham in Morocco.

== History ==
=== Pre-Islamic period ===
According to A. Fischer, the recorded history of Qays, like most Arabian tribes, begins with their engagements in the pre-Islamic Ayyām al-ʿArab (battle days of the Arabs), which Fischer refers to as the "epic of the Arabs". Qaysi tribes were involved in numerous battles and feuds, some of which were against non-Qaysi tribes, but the vast majority being intra-Qaysi conflicts. Historian W. Mongtomery Watt holds that in the history of Ayyam al-Arab, only individual Qaysi tribes were named, rather than the larger confederation. Accordingly, the Qays did not function as a unit in the pre-Islamic era. Among the most well-known Ayyam battles was the Battle of Shi'b Jabala between the Qaysi Amir, Abs, Ghani, Bahila and Bajila on one side and the Qaysi Dhubyan and non-Qaysi Tamim, Banu Asad, Lakhmids and Kindites on the other side. The long war of Dahis and al-Ghabra was fought between the Abs and Dhubyan. Like other central Arabian tribes, the Qays were part of the Kindite Kingdom.

=== Early Islamic period ===
In the beginning, Qaysi tribes were hostile to Muhammad and his Islamic teachings, which conflicted with their polytheistic religion. The Ghatafan and Sulaym, in particular, were in conflict with the Muslims in Medina in between 622 and 629. However, the Ashja' sub-tribe of Ghatafan had made an alliance with the Muslims in 627. By 630, the Sulaym and Ashja' had largely embraced Islam and backed Muhammad's conquest of Mecca in 630. These tribes fought against their Hawazin kinsmen shortly after. By the time of Muhammad's death in 631, all Qaysi tribes had likely converted to Islam, but after his death, many if not most apostatized and fought the Muslims in the Ridda Wars. The most active Qaysi tribe fighting against the Muslims was the Ghatafan, which attempted several times to capture Mecca before joining the anti-Islamic leader, Tulayha of the Banu Asad. The pagan Arab tribes were finally defeated in the Battle of Buzakha, after which they once again returned to Islam and submitted to the Muslim state based in Medina.

After the Ridda Wars, Qaysi tribesmen played an important part in the Muslim conquests of Persia under al-Muthanna al-Shaybani and the Levant. During Caliph Uthman's reign (644–656), the governor of Syria, Mu'awiya I, brought numerous Qaysi tribesmen from the Banu Kilab, Banu Uqayl (both sub-tribes of the Banu Amir) and the Sulaym to inhabit Upper Mesopotamia, northern Syria and the frontier region with the Byzantine Empire and Armenia. Qaysi tribesmen largely fought on the side of Ali against his rivals within Quraysh at the Battle of the Camel in 656 and against Mu'awiya in the Battle of Siffin in 657, respectively.

=== Umayyad era ===
Mu'awiya I founded the Umayyad Caliphate in 661. Between then and the Umayyads' collapse in 750, the Qays formed one of the main political and military components of the Caliphate. Their main antagonist were the Yamani tribes, led by the Banu Kalb. Other than competition for political, military and economic power, there was an ethnic component that defined the Qays–Yaman rivalry; the Qays were "northern Arabs" while the Yaman were "southern Arabs". Mu'awiya and his son and successor Yazid I relied militarily and politically on the Kalb to the chagrin of the Qays. When Yazid and his successor Mu'awiya II died in relatively quick succession in 683 and 684, respectively, the Qays refused to recognize Umayyad authority. The Kalb and their Yamani allies essentially selected Marwan I to succeed Mu'awiya II, while the Qays largely joined the rebel cause of Abd Allah ibn al-Zubayr. Fighting in the latter's name, the Qaysi tribes of Amir, Sulaym and Ghatafan under al-Dahhak ibn Qays al-Fihri fought Marwan I and the Yamani faction at the Battle of Marj Rahit in 684. The Qays were severely routed, leading to years of revenge-driven tit-for-tat raids between the Qays and Yaman.

After Marj Rahit, the Qays came under the leadership of Zufar ibn al-Harith al-Kilabi and Umayr ibn al-Hubab al-Sulami. From their respective strongholds in al-Qarqisiya and Ras al-Ayn they tenaciously fought against the Yaman and resisted Umayyad authority. Most battles against the Kalb were fought in the desert between Syria and Iraq. Umayr also entangled the Qays against the Taghlib, and the two sides fought several battles near the Khabur, Balikh and Tigris rivers. Umayr was killed by the Taghlib in 689 and Zufar submitted to Umayyad authority under Caliph Abd al-Malik in 691 in return for a high place in the Umayyad court. The Qays were strong partisans of the powerful Umayyad governors al-Hajjaj ibn Yusuf of Thaqif and Qutayba ibn Muslim of Bahila. The Qays dominated the Umayyad government during the reigns of Yazid II and Walid II. As a result, the Yaman revolted against and killed Walid II, who was then replaced by Yazid III, who entirely depended on the Yaman. The Qays found a new patron in the Umayyad prince Marwan II, who wrested the Caliphate from Yazid III and relocated the Umayyad capital from Damascus to Harran in Qaysi territory. The Qays were Marwan's principal military source in the Battle of the Zab in 750, in which Marwan was killed; shortly after, the Umayyad realm entirely fell to the Abbasid Caliphate. The Qays were not able to recover from the huge losses they suffered during the late Umayyad period, and their political role, though present, was not of significant consequence during the ensuing Abbasid era.

== Bibliography ==
- Fischer, A. (1934). "Kais-Ailan". In Houtsma, M. Th.; Wensinck, A. J.; Levi-Provençal, E. (eds.). The Encyclopædia of Islam: A Dictionary of the Geography, Ethnography and Biography of the Muhammadan Peoples. Leiden: E. J. Brill. ISBN 9004082654.
- Ibn 'Abd Rabbih (2011). Boullata, Emeritus Issa J. (ed.). The Unique Necklace, Volume III. Reading: Garnet Publishing Limited & Southern Court. pp. 294–295. ISBN 9781859642405.
- Kennedy, Hugh N. (2004). The Prophet and the Age of the Caliphates: The Islamic Near East from the 6th to the 11th Century (Second ed.). Harlow: Pearson Education Limited. ISBN 0-582-40525-4.
- Watt, W. Montgomery (1991) [1978]. "Kays ʿAylan". In Lewis, B.; Pellat, Ch.; Schacht, J. (eds.). The Encyclopedia of Islam. Vol. 4 Ira-Kha (2nd ed.). Leiden and New York: Brill. ISBN 90-04-07026-5.
