= Al-Nabigha =

Pre-Islamic Arabian poet

- النابغة الذبياني
- Born: c. 535; Near Mecca, Arabia
- Died: c. 604
- Occupation: Poet
- Writing career
- Language: Arabic

Al-Nābighah (النابغة الذبياني), al-Nābighah al-Dhubiyānī, or Nābighah al-Dhubyānī; real name Ziyad ibn Muawiyah (c. 535 – c. 604); was one of the last pre-Islamic Arabian poets. "Al-Nabigha" means genius or intelligent in Arabic.

== Biography ==
His tribe, the Banu Dhubyan, belonged to the district near Mecca, but he spent most of his time at the Lakhmid court of al-Hirah and the court of the Ghassanids. In al-Hirah, he remained under al-Mundhir III ibn al-Harith, and then his successor in 562.

After a sojourn at the court of Ghassan, he returned to al-Hirah under al-Nu'man III ibn al-Mundhir. Owing to his verses written about the Queen he was compelled to flee to Ghassan, but returned ca., 600. When Numan died five years later he withdrew to his own tribe.

His date of death is uncertain, but seems to predate Islam. His poems consist largely of eulogies and satires, and are concerned with the strife of Hirah and Ghassan, and of the Banu Abs and the Banu Dhubyan. He is one of the six eminent pre-Islamic poets whose poems were collected before the middle of the 2nd century of Islam, and have been regarded as the standard of Arabic poetry; some writers consider him the first of the six.

== Religious beliefs ==
The religious beliefs of Al-Nabighah are unclear, but he appears to be represented as some sort of monotheist. Al-Nabighah regularly praises, in religious terms, the Christian Ghassanids, for example: "God has arranged for him [the king] the best creation; He [God] is his [king’s] helper over/against the humankind". The following Arabic phrase occurs concerning the Ghassanids: majallatuhum dhātu l-ilāhi. Though the meaning is disputed, Nicolai Sinai and Ilkka Lindstedt both have interpreted it in relation to the Ghassanids possessing some sort of scripture or book bestowed upon them by God (which may or may not refer to the New Testament).

== Editions of poetry ==
His poems were edited by Wilhelm Ahlwardt in the Diwans of the Six Ancient Arabic Poets (London, 1870), and separately by Hartwig Derenbourg (Paris, 1869, a reprint from the Journal asiatique for 1868).

== See also ==
- Qasida
