= Early Islam =

Early Islam may refer to:

- Historiography of early Islam
  - Timeline of early Islamic history
    - Early Muslims
  - Early social changes under Islam
  - Early Muslim conquests
- Early Islamic philosophy

== See also ==
- History of Islam
