= Banu Muharib =

Banu Muharib بنو محارب
- Qaysite Arab tribe
- Banner of Banu Muharib
- Nisba: Al-Muharbi
- Location: Arabian Peninsula
- Religion: Paganism, later Islam

Banu Muharib (Arabic: بنو محارب) was an Arab tribe during the Islamic prophet Muhammad's era. During the Invasion of Thi Amr Muhammad ordered a military raid against them. He ordered his men to raid the Banu Muharib and Banu Talabah tribes after he received intelligence that they were allegedly going to raid the outskirts of Medina

Ghwarath ibn al-Harith (also known as Du'thar ibn al-Harith) is from this tribe.

After the Muslim Conquest of Iraq the tribe settled in al-Kufah

== See also ==
- List of expeditions of Muhammad
