= Expedition of Dhu Qarad =

Date	September 627 AD, 4th month 6 AH or 12th month of 6 AH
Location	Dhu Qarad
Result	As follows: Abd al-Rahman ibn Uyayna ibn Hisn al-Fazari loots Muhammad's milch camels; Muhammad and his companions chase after the thieves and get half their goods back

Commanders and leaders
Salamah ibn al-Akwa	Abd al-Rahman ibn Uyayna ibn Hisn

Strength
500–700 Muslims assembled, only 8 sent	40 horsemen

Casualties and losses
4 killed	4 killed

The Expedition of Dhu Qarad also known as the Expedition of Ghaba took place in September 627 AD, 6 AH of the Islamic calendar. Some scholars say that it took place just before the Battle of Khaybar, in the 12th month of 6 AH.

A few days after Muhammad returned to Medina from the raid on the Banu Lihyan, a band of armed men of Ghatafan led by Abd al-Rahman ibn Uyayna ibn Hisn al-Fazari raided the outskirts of the city; and seized 20 milch camels. They also killed the shepherd and took his wife as a captive.

== Expedition ==
=== Background and reason for attack ===
According to William Montgomery Watt, Uyayna ibn Hisn al-Fazari was annoyed because Muhammad had broken off negotiations with him over the withdrawal of Ghatafan.

Abd al-Rahman ibn Uyayna ibn Hisn al-Fazari made a raid, looted the camels, and killed the man who looked after them and kidnapped his wife. Salamah ibn al-Akwa was the first to find this out, and he chased after him. Muhammad later found out and joined the chase.

The place by which it was fought is known as Dhu Qarad, a reservoir of water at a day's journey from Madinah. According to the majority of scholars, this incident took place three days before the battle of Khaybar.

=== Muslim response ===
A hunt took place, and the camel and the kidnapped women were brought back. Muhammad on his way back to Medina stopped at a place called Dhu Qarad and sacrificed a camel.

Muhammad collected 500-700 fighters, but followed up by sending 8 horsemen. Only 40 enemy horsemen were involved, and the booty Muslims captured was 20 milking camels. Half the camels were recovered, and while doing so, the Muslims killed 4 of the raiders while suffering the same loss of their own men.

== See also ==
- Military career of Muhammad
- List of expeditions of Muhammad
- Muslim–Quraysh War
