= Hatim al-Tai =

6th-century Arab chieftain and poet

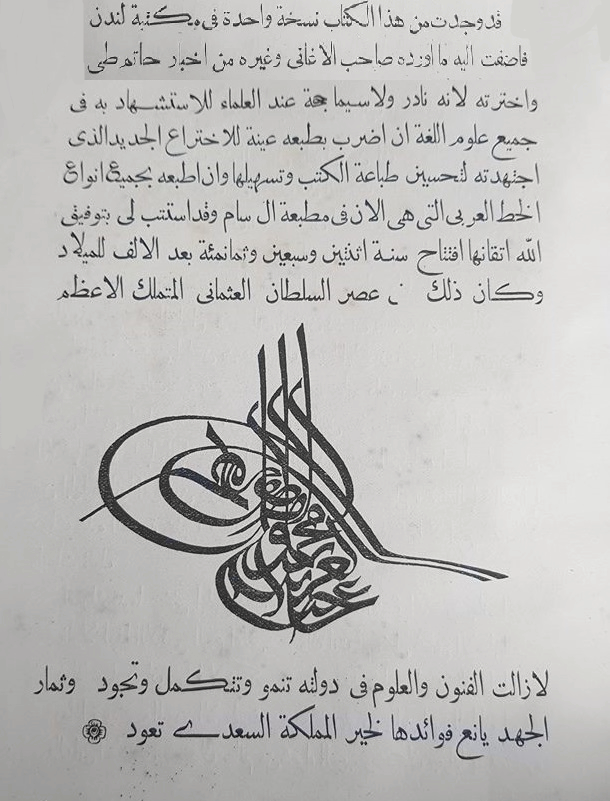
- A page from Hatim al-Tai book includes a du'a for Ottoman Sultan Abdülaziz
- Born: Ḥātim bin ʿAbd Allāh bin Saʿd aṭ-Ṭāʾiyy; Ha'il, Arabia
- Died: c. 578; Tuwarin, Ha'il
- Occupations: Poet, Knight, Chieftain
- Writing career
- Language: Arabic
- Period: Pre-Islamic era
- Genre: Poetry
- Notable work: Qissa-e-Hatem-tai

Hatim al-Tai (Arabic: حاتم الطائي, 'Hatim of the Tayy tribe'; died 578), full name Ḥātim bin ʿAbd Allāh bin Saʿd aṭ-Ṭāʾiyy (Arabic: حاتم بن عبد الله بن سعد الطائي) was an Arab knight, chieftain of the Tayyi tribe of Arabia, ruler of Shammar, and poet who lived in the last half of the sixth into the beginning of the seventh century. Although he was considered a well-established poet in his time, today he is best known for his altruism. Additionally, he is known to be a model of Arab manliness.

Al-Tai is associated with the Lakhmid court in Hira, especially under its most famous king Al-Mundhir III ibn al-Nu'man. Stories about his extreme generosity have made him an icon among Arabs up until today, as evident in the proverbial phrase "more generous than Hatim" (Arabic: أكرم من حاتم, romanized: ʾakram min Ḥātim). According to Arab writer and poet Ibn Abd Rabbih, he was one of three people who reached the highest point of generosity in the pre-Islamic era, the other two were Ka'b ibn Mama and Harim ibn Sinan al-Murri. Al-Tai's generosity and chivalry have become proverbial not only in Arabic but also in Persian.

== Biography ==
Al-Tai lived in Ha'il in the present-day Saudi Arabia and was mentioned in some Hadiths attributed to Muhammad. He died in 578 AD, and was buried in Tuwarin, Ha'il. His tomb is described in the Arabian Nights. His name Hatim refers to a 'black crow' in Arabic.

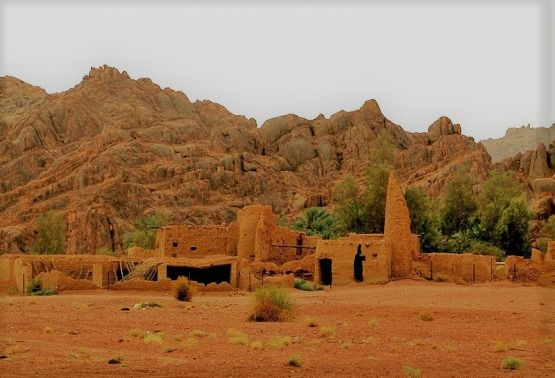
Ruins of Hatim’s Palace in Tuwarin

He lived in the sixth century CE and also figures in the Arabian Nights stories. The celebrated Persian poet Saadi, in his work Gulistan (1259) wrote: "Hatim Taï no longer exists but his exalted name will remain famous for virtue to eternity. Distribute the tithe of your wealth in alms; for when the husbandman lops off the exuberant branches from the vine, it produces an increase of grapes". He is also mentioned in Saadi's Bostan (completed in 1257). According to legends in various books and stories, he was a famous personality in the region of Ta'i (present day Ha'il) and is also a well-known figure in the rest of the Middle East as well as the Indian subcontinent, featuring in many books, films and TV series in Arabic, Persian, Urdu, Turkish, Hindi, Kashmiri and various other languages.

He is associated with the Lakhmid court in Hira, especially under its most famous king Al-Mundhir III ibn al-Nu'man.

It is said that he used to give away everything he possessed except for his mount and weapons.

Rozat-ul-Sufa mentions that "In the eighth year after the birth of his eminence the Prophet (Muhammad), died Noushirwan the Just, and Hatemtai the generous, both famous for their virtues", around 579 CE. According to the 17th-century orientalist D'Herbelot, his tomb was located at a small village called Anwarz, in Arabia.

== Works ==
One of his works is a poem which has been translated into English as "On Avarice".

== Qissa-e-Hatem-tai ==
Outside Arabia, the tales of Hatim are also popular in Persia, India, Bangladesh, and Pakistan.

Qissa-e-Hatem-tai (قصۂ حاتم طائی), alternatively Dastan-e-Hatem-tai (داستانِ حاتم طائی), meaning "The Tale of Hatemtai" is very popular in Persia and the Indian subcontinent. Sayad Haider Bakhsh Haidri, the author of the Qissa-e-Hatim Tai, writes in his introduction that he has taken the story from "someone’s" Persian text, but has amplified and extended it at suitable points "to please the listeners." Multiple films (see below) have been made about Hatim based on this story, which narrates seven of his fantastic adventures in seven chapters.

The books on the story usually consist of a short introduction describing his ancestry and character and tells the seven episodes based on seven riddles, asked by a beautiful and rich woman named Husn Banu (حسن بانو), who will marry only the person who is able to obtain answers to all seven of them. The riddles are:

1. 'What I saw once, I long for a second time.'
2. 'Do good, and cast it upon the waters.'
3. 'Do no evil; if you do, such shall you meet with.'
4. 'He who speaks the truth is always tranquil.'
5. 'Let him bring an account of the mountain of Nida.'
6. 'Let him produce a pearl of the size of a duck's egg.'
7. 'Let him bring an account of the bath of Badgard.'

A king, who falls in love with her but unable to find answers, tells the generous Hatemtai, whom he meets by chance, all about it. Hatim undertakes the quest to find the answers and help the king marry her.

== Film and television ==
=== Film ===
- Hatim Tai (1956), directed by Homi Wadia
- Saat Sawal (1971), directed by Babubhai Mistry
- Hatim Tai (1990), directed by Babubhai Mistry

=== Television ===
- Dastaan-e-Hatimtai - An Indian TV Series aired on DD National.
- Hatim - An Indian TV Series on Star Plus in 2003-2004
- The Adventures of Hatim - A 2013 Indian TV Series on Life OK

== See also ==
- Ka'b Ibn Mama
