= Zuhayr ibn Jadhima =

Mid-6th century chieftain of the Banu Abs

Zuhayr ibn Jadhīma ibn Rawāḥa al-ʿAbsī (Arabic: زهير بن جذيمة) was the chieftain of the Banu Abs who ultimately became the leader of the Ghatafan and Hawazin tribal confederations in pre-Islamic Arabia in the mid-6th century.

== Life ==
Zuhayr was the son of Jadhima ibn Rawaha of the Banu Abs, a subtribe of the larger Arab tribe of Ghatafan. His full genealogy tracing him to the progenitor of the Banu Abs was Zuhayr ibn Jadhima ibn Rawaha ibn Rabi'a ibn Mazin ibn al-Harith ibn Qutay'a ibn Abs. The Banu Abs were based in the Qassim region of Najd in central Arabia. Under Zuhayr's leadership in circa 550, the Ghatafan became a powerful force in Arabia. He was also able to bring the Hawazin under his command. However, the fortunes of the Banu Abs declined considerably when Zuhayr was killed by the chieftain of the Banu 'Amir, Khalid ibn Ja'far al-Kilabi. Zuhayr's son Qays took over leadership of the tribe during the war of Dahis between the Banu Abs and the rest of the Ghatafan led by Hudhayfa ibn Badr of the Banu Fazara.

A fourth-generation, direct descendant of Zuhayr, Wallada bint al-Abbas al-Absiyya, married the Umayyad caliph Abd al-Malik (r. 685–705) and gave birth to the later Umayyad caliphs al-Walid I (r. 705–715) and Sulayman (r. 715–717).

== Bibliography ==
- Elad, Amikam (2016). The Rebellion of Muḥammad al-Nafs al-Zakiyya in 145/762. Brill. ISBN 978-90-04-22989-1.
- Fück, J. W. (1965). "Ghaṭafān". In Lewis, B.; Pellat, Ch. & Schacht, J. (eds.). The Encyclopaedia of Islam, Second Edition. Volume II: C–G. Leiden: E. J. Brill. pp. 1023–1024. OCLC 495469475.
- Hinds, Martin, ed. (1990). The History of al-Ṭabarī, Volume XXIII: The Zenith of the Marwānid House: The Last Years of ʿAbd al-Malik and the Caliphate of al-Walīd, A.D. 700–715/A.H. 81–95. SUNY Series in Near Eastern Studies. Albany, New York: State University of New York Press. ISBN 978-0-88706-721-1.
