= Second pledge at al-Aqabah =

Medinan pledge to the Prophet of Islam

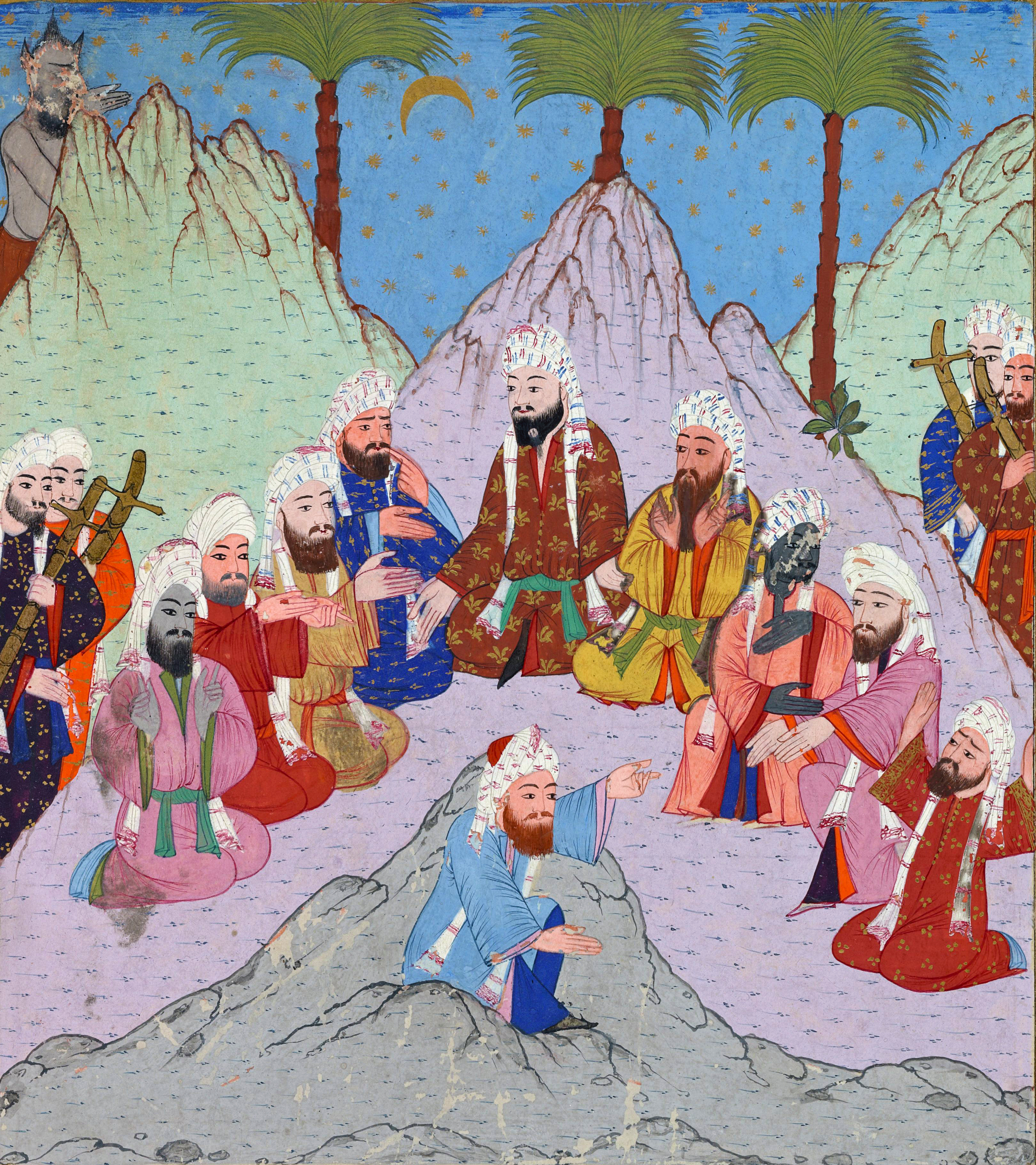
Islamic miniature depicting Iblis (top-left) plotting against Muhammad watching over a meeting by the leaders of the Quraysh (Among them Umayya ibn Khalaf, Abu Sufyān, Khālid ibn al-Walīd, Amr ibn al-‘Āṣ) discussing the second pledge at al-Aqabah, being spied on by the anti-Islamic zealot "the Monk" Abu ʿĀmir al-Rāhib, who is part of Iblis' plan.

The second pledge at al-ʿAqabah (Arabic: بيعة العقبة الثانية, romanized: bayʾa al-ʿaqaba al-thaniya) was an important event in Islam where 75 residents of the city of Medina pledged their loyalty to Muhammad as their leader in an oath of allegiance known as a bay'ah. It preceded the Hijrah, or migration of Muhammad and his supporters from Mecca, where they were persecuted, to Medina, where Muhammad became ruler. The pledge occurred in 622 CE at a mountain pass (al-ʿaqabah) five kilometers from Mecca.

== Event ==
Converts to Islam came from both non-Jewish tribes of Arabia present in Medina, such that by June of the subsequent year seventy-five Muslims came to Mecca for pilgrimage and to meet Muhammad. Meeting him secretly by night, the group made what was known as the Second Pledge of al-ʿAqaba, where the pledge was made. The guarantee of protection led (orientalist) people who studied the language, culture, history or custom of countries in eastern asia and ulema to describe it as the "Pledge of War". Conditions of the pledge, many of which similar to the first, included obedience to Muhammad, enjoining good and forbidding wrong, as well as responding to the call to arms when required.

== See also ==
- Timeline of early Islamic history
