= First Raid on Banu Thalabah =

- Part of the Military campaigns of Muhammad
Date	August 627 AD in 4th month, 6 AH
Location	Ghamrah, Jizan, Arabia
Result	Unsuccessful raid, Banu Thalabah victory: 9 Muslims ambushed and killed

Commanders and leaders
Muhammad ibn Maslamah	Unknown

Strength
10	100

Casualties and losses
9 killed.	Unknown

According to Muslim traditional lore, the First Raid on Banu Thalabah took place in August, 627 AD in 4th month of, 6AH of the Islamic Calendar, under the leadership of Muhammad ibn Maslamah

== Background ==
Muhammad sent a large herd of camels out to graze in the vicinity of Hayfa, a place seven miles from Medina which was lush with green pastures. Due to the continuous drought, Banu Thalabah, a section of the Ghatafan tribe, was tempted to steal from Muhammad's herd.

He suspected mischievousness from these people and sent his trusted lieutenant, Muhammad ibn Maslama with 10 followers to raid the vicinity of Dhu al-Qassah of Banu Thalabah.

== Ambush ==
The Banu Thalabah tribe were already aware of the impending attack; so they lay in wait for the Muslims, and when Muhammad ibn Maslama arrived at the site. The Banu Thalabah, with 100 men ambushed them, while the Muslims were making preparation to sleep; and after a brief resistance killed all of Muhammad ibn Maslama's men. Muhammad ibn Maslama pretended to be dead. A Muslim who happened to pass that way found him and assisted him to return to Medina. The raid was unsuccessful.

== See also ==
- Military career of Muhammad
- List of expeditions of Muhammad
- Second Raid on Banu Thalabah
