= Salama ibn al-Akwa' =

Companion of Muhammad in Islam

Salama ibn al-Akwaʿ (Arabic: سَلَمَة بن الأكْوَع) was one of the companions of the Islamic prophet Muhammad, the commander in the Expedition of Dhu Qarad, and a narrator of Hadīth.

== Name ==
His full name is Salama ibn al-Akwaʿ al-Aslamī.

== Legacy ==
He was one of the notable narrators of hadith. He is known for being an excellent athlete, a very fast runner, and it was said that he could outpace a horse and that his shout could be heard over a distance of 5 miles.

== Military expeditions ==
During Muhammad's era he was the commander in the Expedition of Dhu Qarad

== See also ==
- List of battles of Muhammad
