= Banu Fazara =

Arab tribe from Najd, Saudi Arabia

The Banu Fazāra (بنو فزارة)
- Ghaṭafān Confederation
- Nisba: Al-Fazari
- Descended from: Fazāra ibn Dhubyān ibn Baghīd ibn Rayth ibn Ghaṭafān ibn Saʾd ibn Qays ʿAylān ibn Mudar ibn Nizar ibn Ma'add ibn Adnan
- Parent tribe: Banu Dhubyan (patrilineal); Banu Jusham (matrilineal)
- Branches: Banu Shamkh; Banu Uday; Banu Mazen; Banu Saad; Banu Zalim
- Religion: Islam (post 630s)

The Banu Fazara, Fazzara, Fezara, or Fezzara (Arabic: بنو فزارة, romanized: Banū Fazāra) were a tribe of Arabia whose original homeland was Najd.

== Origins ==
According to the tribal Arab genealogical tradition, the progenitor of the Banu Fazara was Fazāra ibn Dhubyān ibn Baghīḍ ibn Rayth ibn Ghaṭafān. Thus the tribe belonged to the Dhubyan branch of the Ghatafan tribe, making the Banu Fazara a north Arabian tribe. The Banu Fazara ancestral pasture grounds, were in the Wadi al-Rumma region of the Najd which is in central Arabia in current day Saudi Arabia.

== History ==
In the pre-Islamic Arabia, the Banu Fazara were known for their rivalry with the Banu Abs, another branch of the Ghatafan. The two tribes fought against each other in the war of Dahis and al-Ghabra, called after the horses of the tribes' respective chiefs, Qays ibn Zuhayr ibn Jadhima of the Banu Abs and Hudhayfa ibn Badr of the Fazara. According to the story of the war, the Banu Fazara originally bested the Banu Abs due to underhanded acts and the Abs retaliated by killing a brother of Hudhayfa. The latter, then his son Hisn, led the tribe during the long-running war. Peace was eventually established between the brother tribes, after which Fazara, under Hisn's son Uyayna, engaged in feuds with the Banu Amir, the Banu Jusham, and other groups.

The Banu Fazara under Uyayna Ibn Hisn participated in the Qurayshi siege of the Islamic prophet Muhammad in Medina in 627. They later raided a Muslim expedition under Zayd ibn Haritha al-Kalbi, and in 628, supported the Jewish tribes of Khaybar against the Muslims. By 630, Uyayna made peace with Muhammad and participated in the Muslim victories at the Conquest of Mecca and in the Battle of Hunayn. In 631, Tulayha claimed to be a prophet and the recipient of divine revelation and rebelled against Muhammad. Thus, Tulayha became the third person to claim prophethood among the Arabs against Muhammad. Many tribes acknowledged him as a prophet, which made him sufficiently strong and powerful to lead a confederacy of numerous tribes against the Muslims. Banu Fazara delegation submitted to Muhammad, but after his death in 632, broke off allegiance from the Muslims and joined the rebel chief Tulayha ibn Khuwaylid in the Ridda Wars. The Muslims defeated them, and the Banu Fazara submitted once again to the rule of the Muslims.

Today, a section of the Banu Fazara can be found in Sudan and are part of the Sudanese Arabs they are mostly camel nomads who live in the pastures of North Kordofan the tribes of the Dar Hamid, Shanabla, Majaneen, Bani Jarrar, and Bani Dhubian are part of the Sudanese branch of Banu Fazara

== Umm Qirfa ==
Umm Qirfa Fatima was the leader of the Banu Fazara Arab tribe from Wadi al-Qura. Ancient genealogies described Umm Qirfa as a member of the Banu Fazara. She married into the Banu Badr. According to Ibn Ishaq and Al-Tabari, Umm Qirfa was wealthy. She was described as being an old woman with high social status and wife of Malik ibn Hudhayfa ibn Badr al-Fazari. Zayd ibn Haritha al-Kalbi went on a trading journey to Syria and with him was the merchandise for Companions of the Prophet Muhammed. While he was near Wadi' al Qura' he encountered people from the Tribe of Badr of Fazara, whose leader was Umm Qirfa. They attacked him and his companions and snatched all they had of merchandise. Some of his fellows were killed and he himself was carried wounded from the field. Zayd vowed that he would not wash his head for ritual purity until he fought the people of Fazara. When he recovered from his wounds the Prophet Muhammed sent him to punish the people and ordered them to move by the night and rest by the day as a strategy. Zayd went and fought the Fazara in Wadi' al Qura, killed some of them. Qais bin Musahhar killed Mas'ada bin Hakama. Umm Qirfa, her daughter and Abdullah bin Mas'ada were taken as prisoners. Zayd ordered Qais bin Musahhar to kill Umm Qirfa and Qais killed her by putting a rope in her two legs, tying it to two camels and driving them in opposite directions until she was killed, ripped apart. However, the method of her killing is disputed narrations from Ibn Ishaq are not considered reliable due a lack of Isnads. More authentic narrations don't mention her death, but rather her capture alongside her family members and being taken as a prisoner of war, but she was later sent to Mecca as a ransom for the release of Muslim prisoners.

An expedition led by Abu Bakr As-Siddiq or Zaid bin Haritha was despatched to Wadi Al-Qura in Ramadan 6 Hijri after Fazara had made an attempt at the Prophet’s life. Following the morning prayer, the detachment was given orders to raid the enemy. Some of them were killed and others captured. Amongst the captives, were Umm Qirfa and daughter, who was sent to Makkah as a ransom for the release of some Muslim prisoners there. Umm Qirfa’s attempts at the Prophet’s life recoiled on her, and the thirty horsemen she had gathered and sustained to implement her scheme were all killed.

— Safiur Rahman Mubarakpuri, Al-Raheeq al-Makhtum The Sealed Nectar (1st ed.), Dar-us-Salam, p. 337, 1996

== Bibliography ==
- De Premare, A.-L. (1994). "Umm Qirfa et Salmâ, et le mythe des peuples anéantis". Journal asiatique. 282 (1): 19–35. doi:10.2143/JA.282.1.2006115. ISSN 1783-1504.
- Watt, W. Montgomery (1991) [1965]. "Fazāra". In Lewis, B.; Pellat, Ch.; Schacht, J. (eds.). The Encyclopedia of Islam. Vol. II: C–G (new ed.). Leiden and New York: Brill. p. 873. ISBN 90-04-07026-5.
