= Abu Qatada al-Ansari =

Companion of Islamic prophet Muhammad

Abu Qatada ibn Rab'i al-Ansari al-Khazraji أبو قتادة بن ربيع الأنصاري الخزرجي
- Born: Yathrib, Hejaz, Arabia (present-day Medina, Saudi Arabia)
- Died: c. 665; Kufa, Iraq
- Relatives: Rab'i ibn Baldama (father); Kabsha bint Muthar (mother)
- Military career
- Conflicts: Under Muhammad; Battle of Uhud; Battle of the Trench; Battle of Khaybar; Expedition of 'Abdullah ibn 'Atik; Expedition of Khadirah; Expedition of Idam; Battle of Hunayn; Expedition of Tabuk; Under Ali; Battle of the Camel

Abu Qatada al-Ansari (Arabic: أبو قتادة الأنصاري, romanized: Abū Qatāda al-Anṣārī), also known as Al-Harith ibn Rab'i (Arabic: الحارث بن ربعي, romanized: al-Ḥārith ibn Rabʿī), was one of the companions of Muhammad. He assisted the battles of Uhud and Hudaybiyya.

== Biography ==
Abu Qatada was born in Medina and hailed from the Banu Sulaym branch of the Khazraj tribe. He was married to Kabsha bint Kab ibn Malik and had a son named Qatada.

=== Military service under Muhammad ===
Abu Qatada participated in nearly all major engagements of the early Muslim community, with many sources noting his absence only from the Battle of Badr. He distinguished himself as a premier cavalryman during the Expedition of Dhu Qarad (627 AD). Following a Ghatafan raid on the outskirts of Medina, Abu Qatada engaged the invaders in a pursuit, personally defeating their leader, Abd al-Rahman ibn Uyayna, in a duel. This feat led Muhammad to name him the "best of our horse riders."

Beyond open battlefield combat, Abu Qatada was frequently entrusted with high-stakes strategic missions. In 629 AD, he was a key member of the party led by Abdullah ibn Atik that successfully assassinated the tribal instigator Abu Rafi within his Hijaz fortress. Later that year, he was granted independent command of two critical operations: the Expedition of Khadira, where he dispersed gathering Ghatafan forces, and the Expedition of Idam. The latter was a tactical maneuver involving a small unit designed to divert tribal attention away from the Muslims' secret mobilization for the Conquest of Mecca. days to reach their destinations. the expedition was a success as Abu Qatada killed and captured several members of Ghatafan tribe during the raid while also manage to secure spoils.

Abu Qatada concluded his service under Muhammad at the Battle of Hunayn, where he was noted for his defense of the army during the initial ambush and his subsequent narrations regarding the division of war booty.

=== Later career and Caliphate of Ali ===
During the caliphate of Ali, Abu Qatada remained a staunch supporter, participating in all major campaigns including the Battle of the Camel. Upon entering Basra, he reportedly led a contingent of 1,000 horsemen, maintaining his reputation as a senior military commander.

=== Death ===
Abu Qatada died in Kufa, Iraq in 50 AH or 665 AD.

== Legacy ==
Abu Qatada known in Islamic scholars community as narrators of many hadiths which quoted in several hadith collections, including Sahih Bukhari.

Abu Qatada narrated:

A funeral procession passed by Allah's Apostle who said, "Relieved or relieving?" The people asked, "O Allah's Apostle! What is relieved and relieving?" He said, "A believer is relieved (by death) from the troubles and hardships of the world and leaves for the Mercy of Allah, while (the death of) a wicked person relieves the people, the land, the trees, (and) the animals from him."

Abu Qatada also narrated hadith regarding fiqh ruling of swearing in transaction which became basis guidance for Sunni Madhhab scholars to implement Sharia law regarding communication during any economical transaction

== See also ==
- List of Sahabah
