= Raid on Dhu Amarr =

625 historical campaign by Muhammad

Invasion of Dhi Amr
Date	625 AD, AH 3, Muharram
Location	Dhi Amr
Result	Muslim victory; Muhammad sends 450 men after the Banu Thalabah and Banu Muharib tribes; Tribe members flee into mountains

Belligerents
First Islamic State	Banu Muharib; Banu Thalabah

Commanders and leaders
Muhammad	Unknown

Strength
450	Unknown

Casualties and losses
0	1 captured

The raid on Amarr (Arabic: غزوة ذي أمر), also known as the Raid on Ghatafan, occurred directly after the Invasion of Sawiq in the year A.H. 3 of the Islamic calendar, March 625. The expedition was ordered by Muhammad after he received intelligence that the Banu Muharib and Banu Thalabah tribes were planning to raid the outskirts of Madinah. Therefore, Muhammad launched a pre-emptive strike with 450 men.

When the enemies heard of the imminent arrival of Muhammad, they quickly fled. The Muslims also captured a man who later converted to Islam and acted as their guide.

This event is mentioned in Ibn Hisham's biography of Muhammad, and other historical sources.

== Background ==
A month after the Invasion of Sawiq, Muhammad learnt that some clans of the Ghatafan tribesmen had gathered troops at Dhu Amar in Nejd. So, Muhammad led an expedition of 450 fighters to search out the enemy and disperse them. He left Uthman in charge of Medina.

This was the largest military exercise led by Muhammad prior to the Battle of Uhud.

== Raid ==
However, the enemy got wind of Muhammad's departure and took to hiding. Muhammad's army was able to capture one man who gave information about the Ghatafan's hideout. The enemy soon heard of Muhammad's approach and they took sanctuary on the tops of the hills.

== Attempted assassination ==
=== Attempted assassination in Quran ===
According to the Muslim scholar Sami Strauch, it is reported in Sahih Bukhari that it was raining, and Muhammad took his garments off and hung them on a tree to dry, while the enemy was watching, Ghwarath ibn al-Harith went to attack Muhammad. He threatened Muhammad with his sword and said "Who will protect you from me on this day?" Then according to Muslim scholars the Angel Gabriel came and thumped Ghawrath in the chest and forced him to drop his sword. Muhammad then picked up the sword and said "Who will protect you from me?"

Ghawrath replied: "No one, and I testify there is no God worthy of worship but Allah" and he then converted to Islam. The Quran says regarding this incident:

O ye who believe! Call in remembrance the favour of Allah unto you when certain men formed the design to stretch out their hands against you, but (Allah) held back their hands from you: so fear Allah. And on Allah let believers put (all) their trust. ^{[Quran 5:11]}

Muhammad spent 11 days on this expedition and then returned to Medina.

=== Attempted assassination in Hadith ===
Sahih al Bukhari mentions this incident:

That he fought in a Ghazwa towards Najd along with Allah's Apostle and when Allah's Apostle returned, he too, returned along with him. The time of the afternoon nap overtook them when they were in a valley full of thorny trees. Allah's Apostle dismounted and the people dispersed amongst the thorny trees, seeking the shade of the trees. Allah's apostle took shelter under a samura tree and hung his sword on it. We slept for a while when Allah's Apostle suddenly called us, and we went to him, to find a Bedouin sitting with him. Allah's Apostle said, "This (Bedouin) took my sword out of its sheath while I was asleep. When I woke up, the naked sword was in his hand and he said to me, 'Who can save you from me?, I replied, 'Allah.' Now here he is sitting." Allah's Apostle did not punish him (for that)"Sahih al-Bukhari, 5:59:458

=== Attempted assassination in Biographical literature ===
This incident is also mentioned in Ibn Sa'd Kitab Al-tabaqat Al-Kabir, Volume 2.

== See also ==
- List of expeditions of Muhammad
