= Nasser Al-Duwailah =

Kuwaiti politician (born 1956)

Nasser Al-Duwailah was a member of the Kuwaiti National Assembly, representing the fourth district. Born in 1956, Al-Duwailah studied military science and sharia law and worked as a lawyer and army commander before being elected to the National Assembly in 2008. While political parties are technically illegal in Kuwait, Al-Duwailah affiliates with the Islamist deputies. He is a member of the Al-Rashaydah tribe.

== Supports Project Kuwait ==
- Al-Duwailah supports Project Kuwait.
