= Second raid on Banu Thalabah =

Battle in 627

Date	August 627 AD in 4th month, 6 AH
Location	Ghamrah
Result	Banu Thalabah tribe flees

Commanders and leaders
Abu Ubaidah ibn al-Jarrah	Unknown

Strength
40	Unknown

Casualties and losses
None.	1 captured

The Second raid on Banu Thalabah took place in August, 627AD in 4th month of, 6AH of the Islamic calendar, under the leadership of Abu Ubaidah

The First Raid on Banu Thalabah was a failure, and many of Muhammad's companions were ambushed and killed. When Muhammad, learned of this incident, he immediately dispatched an army of 40 soldiers under the leadership of Abu Ubaidah bin al-Jarrah in retaliation for the killings of his companions. This army arrived there in Dhu al-Qassah just before dawn. Immediately upon their arrival, they raided the inhabitants by surprise, but they quickly fled to the mountains. The Muslims took their cattle, clothes and captured one man. The captured man embraced Islam and Muhammad released him.

== See also ==
- Military career of Muhammad
- List of expeditions of Muhammad
- Muslim–Quraysh War
