= Expedition of Abu Qatadah ibn Rab'i al-Ansari (Khadirah) =

Abu Qatadah ibn Rab'i al-Ansari (Khadirah)
Date	November 629 AD, 8 AH
Location	Khadirah
Result	Successful raid, some enemies killed; Large amount of flock captured

Commanders and leaders
Abu Qatadah ibn Rab'i al-Ansari	Unknown

Strength
15	Unknown

Casualties and losses
0	Some killed, some captured (unknown numbers)

Expedition of Abu Qatadah ibn Rab'i al-Ansari, to Khadirah (also spelt Khadrah), and also known as the Campaign of Khadrah took place in November 629 AD, 8AH, 8th month, of the Islamic Calendar

== Expedition ==
In Sha‘ban month 8 A.H., news reached Muhammad of amassing troops by Bani Ghatafan, still outside the domain of Islam. He urgently summoned Abu Qatadah and sent him at the head of 18 men to discipline the tribe.

It took 15 days to reach them. Some were killed, others captured and all their property confiscated.

This was an expedition against the tribe of Khudra a sub-clan of Banu Ghatafan, which resulted in the capture of large amounts of flock.

After this expedition, due to Muhammad's increasing power, many tribes switched their allegiance and converted to Islam. Among them were: Bani Dzobian, Banu Fazara, Banu Murra hand Banu Abs. The Banu Sulaym also submitted themselves to Muhammad after previously fighting his followers in the Expedition of Ibn Abi Al-Awja Al-Sulami, where most of the Muslims and Banu Sulaym who fought each other were killed. Most of the tribes in the vicinity of Medina also recognised the supremacy of Muhammad.

== See also ==
- Military career of Muhammad
- List of expeditions of Muhammad
