= Expedition of Abu Qatadah ibn Rab'i al-Ansari (Batn Edam) =

Abu Qatadah ibn Rab'i al-Ansari (Batn Edam)
Date	November 629 AD, 8 AH
Location	Batn Edam
Result	Successful caravan raid

Commanders and leaders
Abu Qatadah ibn Rab'i al-Ansari	Unknown

Strength
8	Unknown

Casualties and losses
0	Leader of Caravan killed

Expedition of Abu Qatadah ibn Rab'i al-Ansari, to Batn Edam (also spelt Idam) took place in November 629 AD, 8AH, 8th month, of the Islamic Calendar

== Expedition ==
Muhammad was planning on attacking Mecca, with the view of securing a complete news black-out concerning his military intentions, then Muhammad despatched an 8 man platoon under the leadership of Abu Qatadah bin Rab‘i in the direction of Edam, a short distance from Madinah, in Ramadan 8 A.H, in order to divert the attention of people from his main target of attacking Mecca, with which he was pre-occupied.

According to Ibn Sa'd, Ibn Hisham, and many Sunni hadith collections, a Bedouin caravan passed by and they greeted the Muslims with “Assalamu Alaikum.” But Muhallam bin Juthamah (who was with Abu Qatadah) attacked the caravan anyway and killed the leader. They returned to Muhammad with the flock they captured and told him the story.

Muhammad then revealed the verse 4:94.Ibn Kathir interprets this as, God asking Muslims to be more careful when fighting "in the way of Allah", as to reduce the chance of killing Muslims accidentally, as happened in this incident.

== Islamic primary sources ==
The event is mentioned in the Quran verse 4:94:

O ye who believe! When ye go abroad in the cause of Allah, investigate carefully, and say not to any one who offers you a salutation: "Thou art none of a believer!" Coveting the perishable goods of this life: with Allah are profits and spoils abundant. Even thus were ye yourselves before, till Allah conferred on you His favours: Therefore carefully investigate. For Allah is well aware of all that ye do. ^{[Quran 4:94]}

The famous Muslim scholar Ibn Kathir's commentary of the verse in his Tafsir is as follows:

Imam Ahmad recorded that `Ikrimah said that Ibn `Abbas said, "A man from Bani Sulaym, who was tending a flock of sheep, passed by some of the Companions of the Prophet and said Salam to them. They said (to each other), `He only said Salam to protect himself from us.' Then they attacked him and killed him. They brought his sheep to the Prophet, and this Ayah was revealed,

(O you who believe!), until the end of the Ayah." At-Tirmidhi recorded this in his (chapter on) Tafsir, and said, "This Hadith is Hasan, and it is also reported from Usamah bin Zayd." Al-Hakim also recorded it and said, "Its chain is Sahih, but they did not collect it." Al-Bukhari recorded that Ibn `Abbas commented;

(and say not to anyone who greets you: "You are not a believer;"), "A man was tending his sheep and the Muslims caught up with him. He said, `As-Salamu `Alaykum.' However, they killed him and took his sheep. Allah revealed the Ayah;

(And say not to anyone who greets you: "You are not a believer; seeking the perishable goods of the worldly life)." Ibn `Abbas said; "The goods of this world were those sheep." And he recited,

(Peace) Imam Ahmad recorded that Al-Qa`qa` bin Abdullah bin Abi Hadrad narrated that his father `Abdullah bin Abi Hadrad said, "The Messenger of Allah sent us to (the area of) Idam. I rode out with a group of Muslims that included Abu Qatadah, Al-Harith bin Rab`i and Muhallam bin Juthamah bin Qays. We continued on until we reached the area of Idam, where `Amr bin Al-Adbat Al-Ashja`i passed by us on his camel. When he passed by us he said Salam to us, and we did not attack him. Because of some previous problems with him, Muhallam bin Juthamah killed him and took his camel. When we went back to the Messenger of Allah and told him what had happened, a part of the Qur'an was revealed about us,

(O you who believe! When you go (to fight) in the cause of Allah)
[Tafsir Ibn Kathir, Commentary on 4:94]

The event is also referenced in the Sunni Hadith collection, Sahih Muslim as follows:

Ibn Abbas reported that some Muslims met a person with a small flock of sheep. He said: As-Salam-o-'Alaikum. They caught hold of him and killed him and took possession of his flock. Then this verse was revealed:" He who meets you and extends you salutations (assalamu alaikum), don't say: You are not a Muslim" (iv. 94). Ibn 'Abbas, however, recited the word as-Salaam instead of "as-salam".Sahih Muslim, 43:7176

== See also ==
- Military career of Muhammad
- List of expeditions of Muhammad
