= Ghawrath ibn al-Harith =

Sahabah

Ghawrath ibn al-Harith also known as Du'thar ibn al-Harith was a companion (Sahaba) of Muhammad. He was the first person to try to assassinate Muhammad during the Invasion of Dhi Amr.

== Assassination attempt ==
According to Muslim scholar Sami Strauch, it is reported in Sahih Bukhari that it was raining, and Muhammad took his garments off and hung them on a tree to dry. While the enemy was watching, Ghawrath ibn al-Harith went to attack Muhammad. He threatened Muhammad with his sword and said "who will protect you from me on this day". Then, according to Muslim scholars, the Angel Gabriel appeared, thumped Ghawrath in the chest and forced him to drop his sword. Muhammad then picked up the sword and said "who will protect you from me" then he forgave him.

Sahih al Bukhari mentions this incident:

That he fought in a Ghazwa towards Najd along with Allah's Apostle and when Allah's Apostle returned, he too, returned along with him. The time of the afternoon nap overtook them when they were in a valley full of thorny trees. Allah's Apostle dismounted and the people dispersed amongst the thorny trees, seeking the shade of the trees. Allah's apostle took shelter under a samura tree and hung his sword on it. We slept for a while when Allah's Apostle suddenly called us, and we went to him, to find a Bedouin sitting with him. Allah's Apostle said, "This (Bedouin) took my sword out of its sheath while I was asleep. When I woke up, the naked sword was in his hand and he said to me, 'Who can save you from me?, I replied, 'Allah.' Now here he is sitting." Allah's Apostle did not punish him (for that)"Sahih al-Bukhari, 5:59:458

== See also ==
- List of expeditions of Muhammad
