= Banu Murra =

The Banu Murra (Arabic: بَنُو مُرَّة)
- Ghatafani Arab tribe
- Nisba: Al-Marri
- Descended from: Murra ibn Dhubyān ibn Baghīd ibn Rayth ibn Ghaṭafān ibn Saʾd ibn Qays ʿAylān ibn Mudar ibn Nizar ibn Ma'add ibn Adnan
- Parent tribe: Dhubyan
- Religion: Islam (post 630s)

Banu Murra (Arabic: بَنُو مُرَّة) was a tribe during the era of the Islamic prophet Muhammad. They participated in the Battle of the Trench.

They were members of the Ghatafan tribe.

== See also ==
- List of battles of Muhammad
