= Banu Dhubyan =

Arabian tribe

The Banu Dhubyān (Arabic: بَنُو ذُبيَان)
- Ghatafani, Qaysi
- Descended from: Dhubyān ibn Baghīd ibn Rayth ibn Ghaṭafān ibn Saʾd ibn Qays ʿAylān ibn Mudar ibn Nizar ibn Ma'ad ibn Adnan.
- Parent tribe: Ghatafan
- Branches: Banu Fazara; Banu Murra; Banu Tha’laba
- Religion: Christianity (pre 630s); Islam (post 630s)

Dhubyan or Banu Dhubyan (Arabic: بَنُو ذُبيَان) are an Arabian tribe of Ghatafan branch, one of the Adnani branches. Banu Dhubyan inhabited the Hijaz region.

== Influential people of Dhubyan ==
- Al-Nabigha
