= Banu Abs =

Arab tribe

Banu ʿAbs (Arabic: بنو عبس)
- Ghatafan, Qays, Adnanite
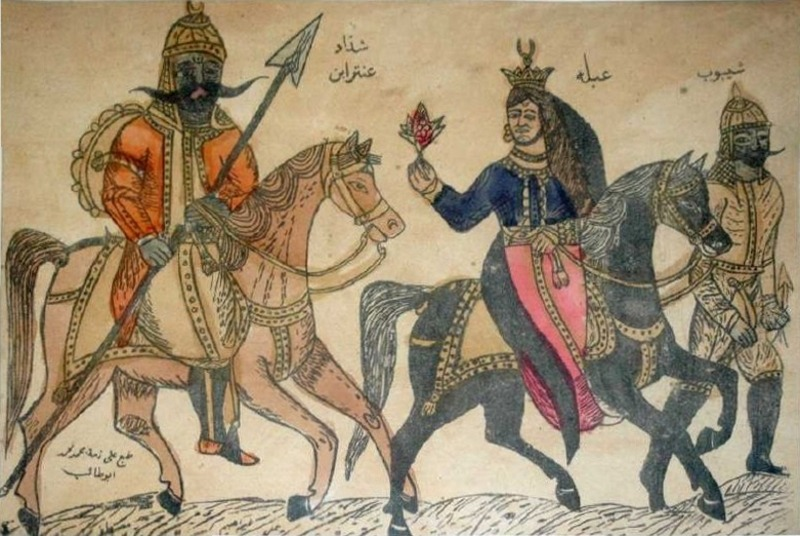
- Nisba: (al-)ʿAbsī
- Location: Saudi Arabia, Oman, Qatar, Eritrea, Kuwait, Jordan, United Arab Emirates, Palestine, Syria, Lebanon, Yemen, Egypt, Arab world, Malaysia, Europe, United States, Canada, Brazil
- Descended from: Abs ibn Baghid ibn Rayth ibn Ghatafan
- Population: est. 2,000,000
- Branches: Banu Rasheed, Banu Rawaha, certain branches of the Mahas peoples
- Religion: Sunni Islam (Primarily), Christianity (Minority)

The Banu Abs (Arabic: بنو عبس, [ˈbænuː ˈʕæbs] lit. "sons of ʿAbs") are an ancient Bedouin tribe that originated in central Arabia. They form a branch of the powerful and numerous Ghatafan tribes. They still inhabit the Arabian Peninsula and North Africa but have spread to many other regions of the world, as well. Their descendants today include the large Al Qubaisat tribe located in United Arab Emirates, Bani Rasheed tribe located in Saudi Arabia, Qatar, Yemen, Kuwait, United Arab Emirates, Oman, Sudan, Eritrea, and Jordan, and the Banu Rawaha located mostly in Oman and the UAE. Parts of the Mahas tribe of the Butana region in Sudan are also linked by blood to the Banu Abs due to intermarriage between the Sudanese Rashaida tribe and the Mahas peoples. One of the earliest stories concerning this tribe was the famous classical love and war story of Antar and Abla.

== Genealogy ==
The Banu Abs are of the Northern Adnanite Arabs, meaning they descend from Adnan. The Banu Abs line of patrilineal descent, from Abs all the way back to Adnan, is as follows: Abs ibn Baghid ibn Rayth ibn Ghatafan ibn Sa'd ibn Qays ibn Mudar ibn Nizar ibn Ma'ad ibn Adnan.

Map of the Arabian Peninsula in 600 AD, showing the various Arab tribes and their areas of settlement. The Lakhmids (yellow) formed an Arab monarchy as clients of the Sasanian Empire, while the Ghassanids (red) formed an Arab monarchy as clients of the Roman Empire A map published by the British academic Harold Dixon during World War I, showing the presence of the Arab tribes in West Asia, 1914

== History ==
The Banu Abs was a branch of the Ghatafan clan, inhabiting the outskirts of Medina in modern Hejaz, an area called today Hurrat Bani Rasheed.

The tribe is known for its independence and bravery, as it had been called one of the Jamarat of the Arabs, or the most powerful tribes that took no allegiance to anyone but themselves. The earliest stories regard tales of war and chivalry before Islam, in the famous war of al-Dahhas wal Ghabra, between them and their brother tribe, the Banu Dhubyan, which had lasted almost 40 years. The war had ended when Zuhayr ibn Jadhima of the Banu Abs had called for an end to the bloodshed, asking the wealthy merchants of both tribes to pay the losses caused by the war. Their traditions further recall 3,000 of them repelling a Sasanian attack of 20,000.

Absi traditions tell of their prophet Khalid ibn Sinan who taught them Biblical monotheism, and the worship of God as "al-ahad al-samad", prior to Muhammad. It was told that Khalid saved his tribe (accounts differ on how) and that most men of the Abs rejected this prophet at the time.

During the Arab conquests some Absis remembered their prophet Khalid again; others, like Ubayy ibn Amara ibn Malik, accepted Muhammad as prophet and are now ranked as Companions. Some Absis settled at Manbij in Syria, others at the Nile. In North Africa one Ka'b, a close relative of Khalid (some say the son of his daughter), adopted some Berbers as clients, and spread the word of Khalid amongst them alongside that of Muhammad.

As Muslims the Abs (and some Berbers) insisted on their veneration for Khalid; some have claimed that Khalid prophesied the 'last' prophet after him, who in Islam is Muhammad. Another tradition has it that King Zuhayr had predicted Muhammad, but Zuhayr is not called prophet for that.

On Khalid's status, the Muslims have historically been divided. Other Arab tribes had either suffered false prophets, as the Asad suffered Tulayha; or, like the 'Ad and the Thamud, they received the preachings of their prophets, disbelieved, and were destroyed(although some living tribes have claimed a rebirth from those dead tribes' surviving prophets, as Yemenis claim of Hud). Also if the bedouin Khalid were accepted as a prophet between Jesus and Muhammad this is constrained by Q. 12:109, which insists that Apostles must come from the towns.

=== Antarah ibn Shaddad ===
Antarah ibn Shaddad al-Absi (c. 525–615), or 'Antar al-Absi, was one of the seven great pre-Islamic Arab poets and the protagonist of the great story Antar and Abla. Throughout this non-fiction story, he displayed chivalry, bravery, and eloquence in the Arabic language. This earned him the name among all of the Arabs of the Peninsula as the "Complete Knight". Furthermore, he was the author of the Divan and he was a warrior. His father was a leader of the Banu ʿAbs tribe named Shaddad and his mother was Zabiba, an African Abyssinian slave who was originally captured during a battle between the invading Banu Abs tribe and the ancient Abyssinian army (specifically the Kingdom of Aksum).

This most famous member of the Banu Abs tribe has had a cultural impact beyond Arabia and even into the modern era. A number of modern cultural artistic works are inspired by the warrior-poet 'Antar. These include Nikolai Rimsky-Korsakov's Symphony No. 2, which is based on the legend of ʿAntar, as well as the first Palestinian opera composed in 1988 by Mustapha al-Kurd, of which Antarah ibn Shaddad was the primary subject.

=== Role in medieval Syria ===
The Banu Abs gained significant wealth and property in Syria and influence in the Umayyad caliphal court mainly through the marriage of the Umayyad caliph Abd al-Malik (r. 685–705) to the Absi noblewoman Wallada, the daughter of al-Abbas ibn al-Jaz ibn al-Harith, a great-grandson of Zuhayr ibn Jadhima. Wallada mothered Abd al-Malik's sons and successors al-Walid I (r. 705–715) and Sulayman (r. 715–717). Abd al-Malik granted estates to Wallada's father al-Abbas and her first cousin al-Qa'qa ibn Khulayd ibn al-Jaz, including the massive estate which developed into the town of Hiyar Bani Qa'qa or Hiyar Bani Abs in northwestern Syria near Manbij where the family established itself. Al-Walid I granted further estates to al-Qa'qa near Damascus and Manbij and made him his katib (scribe or secretary). The caliph appointed another member of the tribe, Khalid ibn Barz ibn Kamil ibn Barz, governor of Jund Dimashq (military district of Damascus). Al-Qa'qa backed the abortive efforts by al-Walid I to replace Sulayman with his son Abd al-Aziz ibn al-Walid as caliphal successor. Al-Qa'qa's uncle Abd Allah ibn al-Jaz was a prominent dignitary in Syria and al-Qa'qa's brother Husayn was a companion of Caliph Sulayman.

Al-Qa'qa's sons al-Walid and Abd al-Malik, both named after their Umayyad kinsmen, served as the governors of the junds (military districts) of Qinnasrin and Homs under Caliph Hisham ibn Abd al-Malik (r. 724–743). Al-Walid and Abd al-Malik (al-Qa'qa's sons) played a role in the unsuccessful attempt to install Hisham's son Maslama as his successor over his nephew, the appointed successor al-Walid II (r. 743–744). As a result, they were both tortured to death by al-Walid II's governor of Qinnasrin, Yusuf, the son of Umar ibn Hubayra al-Fazari. Al-Walid ibn Qa'qa's son Thumama later served as a commander under the Abbasids, who toppled the Umayyads in 750, and led summer expeditions against the Byzantine Empire. His son Uthman became a semi-autonomous local leader in Jund Qinnasrin in the aftermath of the Fourth Muslim Civil War (813–819).

As late as the 10th and 11th centuries, the Banu Abs continued to occupy Hiyar Bani Qa'qa and the neighboring Wadi Butnan valley, as well as Hadhir Qinnasrin south of Aleppo. The tribe, like other old-established tribes in Jund Qinnasrin, had become largely sedentarized while maintaining their tribal structure and customs. The local 14th-century historian Abu'l-Fida that in his time, the lands of Kura al-Hiyar (Hiyar Bani Qa'qa) were desert and inhabited by wild animals, but that the Abs and their brother tribe of Fazara, and other Arabs, still encamped there.

=== Modern era ===
The modern Banu Abs tribe is quite large and scattered across the region. Significant populations of this tribe can be found in Saudi Arabia, Oman, Eritrea, Palestine, Yemen, Sudan, Kuwait, Egypt, and Jordan. In addition, branches of the tribe can be found in the United Arab Emirates and elsewhere in the Arab World, as well as in Malaysia, Europe, the United States, and Brazil. Members and descendants of the tribe may carry the tribal name or some variation thereof, such as: Alabsi, Al-Absy, al-Absy, Al'Absy, Al Absy, Al-Absi, al-Absi, Al'Absi, Al Absi, Absy, Absi, Absey, Abzi, etc.

== Culture ==
The modern Bedouins in Arabia value ancient Arab traditions including chivalry, honor, bravery, honesty, nobility, hospitality, and generosity. While the Banu 'Abs share such values with their tribal neighbors, they are famous for their unique tribal cultural values. In addition to the aforementioned Bedouin mores, the Banu 'Abs greatly value very ancient traditions that are held in high regard. This helps distinguish them from the many other tribes in Arabia. The main branch of the Banu 'Abs tribe has succeeded in preserving their traditional dress, language, and ethics despite the Westernization of some of their neighbors. The traditional dialect of the tribe is a form of Hejazi and Najdi Arabic. Specifically, it is a mix between the dialect of the northern peoples of Ha'il, the standard Bedouin dialect and Hijazi Arabic. The Banu 'Abs tribe has its own tribal emblem or symbol, which is a practice that is common amongst Arab tribes. This symbol has been lost to some branches of the tribe which settled in other regions.

Branches of the Banu Abs located in other countries uphold their clan-based traditions such as maintaining a clan head to whom all respect is directed and from whom tribal edicts are delivered, upholding traditional codes of honor and utmost family loyalty, and establishing and holding tribal Diwans. Maintaining and respecting family traditions is an important aspect of what differentiates members of the Banu Abs diaspora. At the same time, they have also adapted to their local cultures, incorporating traditions, stories, legends, foods, and music from the lands where they have settled.

While the original Banu Abs have their own tribal emblem, many of the scattered branches outside of Saudi Arabia have developed their own independent tribal crests and flags to identify, and take pride in, their section of the extended family. Some branches of the tribe have also developed their own mottos, fables, and proverbs.

It is a common practice for branches of the Banu Abs tribe to maintain private family genealogies and histories that trace their patrilineal lines from their modern members all the way back to Abs, Adnan, Ishmael, Abraham, and ultimately to Adam. These private family histories of their ancestors also record notable details about historical members of the tribe. These histories can include dates of birth and/or death, mention of wars or battles participated in, various deeds done and honors earned, details of personalities and reputations, information on the crafts, trades, and businesses that the people engaged in, any peculiar or interesting causes of death, and other notable events or actions.

=== Social work ===
The sheer numbers, and widespread nature, of the Banu Abs clan have contributed to the formation of various tribal organizations, divans, cultural groups, and charitable trusts.

One example is the 'Abs Universal Organization for Social Development. This is a non-profit organization dedicated to:

"Social, cultural, economic and humanitarian organization. It aims to improve the living conditions of Rashaida people and in particular the Rashaida people in the Sudan, Eritrea and poor areas. Also, it aims to raise the level of education and cultural knowledge for Rashaida people in the whole Arabic world."

- The organization includes some charities. The charities are going to build some schools and hospitals in some poor countries that are home to Rashidi people.

The President is Mr. Fayez Albghaili Al- Rashidi

Secretary-General is Mr. Mubarak Al-Duwailah

Deputy of Secretary-General Dr. Abdullah Saad Alawaimrai"^{5}

== Descendant branches ==
=== Banu Rasheed ===
The Bani Rasheed or Rashaida peoples are the sons of Rasheed Al-Zaul Al-Absi. Rasheed Al-Zaul was one of the Banu Abs tribe's most famous warriors, living in the 7th century. Afterwards, his progeny named themselves after him. The Rashaida peoples are currently located in Saudi Arabia, Kuwait, Sudan, Eritrea, Jordan, Yemen, Libya, Tunisia, United Arab Emirates, Oman.

=== Al Hubus ===
The Al Hubus, or Habsi tribe, are one of the largest tribes of Oman. The inhabitants of this tribe reside in the Eastern region of Oman, and Ras al-Khaimah alongside the Shuhooh. They descend directly from Banu Abs, and branch into several other large tribes. Some of the most notable are: the Jawaber (Al Jabry, which is distinct from Bani Jabir of Yemen or Hamdan, present in other parts of Oman), Yal Thaneen, Aial Mahara, Aial Abdu, Awlad Habn, Al Ghassassina, Bani Bu Said, Maqadima, Ghananima, Sawalem, Najyah, and the Asiyrah.

Like their central Arabian cousins, the Habsi tribe and its many branches are known for their courage, strength, and bravery.

=== Mahas people ===
The Mahas people are a tribe that are descended on the matrilineal side from a combination of the Banu Khazraj of Arabia (of whom the Nasrid dynasty of Granada was also descended) and the Nubians. There is some intermarriage between the Rashaida peoples and the Mahas peoples of the Butana region in Sudan. Due to their intermarriage with the Rashaida peoples, some branches of the Mahas are partially linked to the Banu Abs tribe, as well. It is unclear when exactly they intermarried, and which full name they would carry, whether back to Adnan (of the Rashaida and Banu Abs) or Qahtan (of the Khazraj). Members of the Mahas that are descended from the Banu Abs are, by blood, technically a combination of Adnanite, Qahtanite, and Azdite.

== Notable members ==
=== Pre-modern ===
- Khaled ibn Sinan
- Antarah ibn Shaddad
- Harith ibn Rab'i al-Absi: Also known as Abu Qatada al-Ansari, he was one of the companions, or Sahabah, of Muhammad. He participated in the battle of Uhud in 625 CE and he took part in the events of Hudaybiyyah. He also took part in the Battle of the Camel in 656 CE, serving in the Rashidun Caliph Ali's forces. During this battle he was armed with a bow and sword and wore a white turban while he served as a commander of a contingent of 1000 cavalrymen. His wife was Kabsha bint Kab ibn Malike and his son was named Qatada ibn al-Harith.
- Hudhayfah ibn al-Yaman: Hudhayfah (died in 656 CE) was one of the Sahabah (companions) of Muhammad.
- Qurra ibn Sharik al-Absi: Qurra ibn Sharik (or Sharif) al-Absi was the governor of Egypt in 709–715 CE, under the Umayyad Caliphate. A sharif from Qinnasrin, he was previously the governor of his home province in Syria before being relocated to Egypt by Caliph Al-Walid I.
- Ka'b ibn Hamid al-Absi: Served as commander of the Caliph's household guard under the Umayyad Caliph Sulayman, and his successor Caliph Umar II, between 715 and 720 CE (History of al-Tabari, Vol. XXIV, The Empire in Transition). According to the cited source, after Sulayman's death, Ka'b assisted in the initial transition of power between him and his son, Umar II.
- Hudhaifa ibn al-Ahwas al-Absi: Ruled as the Umayyad-appointed governor of newly conquered Islamic Spain (al-Andalus) for a period of one year in 728 CE (1984, Aḥmad ibn Muḥammad Maqqarī, The History of the Mohammedan Dynasties in Spain: Extracted from the Nafhu-t-tíb Min Ghosni-l-Andalusi-r-rattíb Wa Táríkh Lisánu-d-Dín Ibni-l-Khattíb, Volume 2, 665pp).
- al-Qa'qa' ibn Khulayd (or Khalid) al-Absi
- Thumama ibn al-Walid
- Ali ibn Ziyad: Ali ibn Ziyad at-Tarabulsi al-Tunisi al-'Absi (d. 799) more commonly referred to in Islamic scholarship as Ali ibn Ziyad or Imam al-Tarabulsi, was an 8th-century Tunisian Muslim jurist from Tripoli.
- Uthman al-Absi al-Kufi: He was a traditionalist, a hàfiz, a lawyer, an historian, and commentator born in Kufa, Iraq (159 - 235 AH / 775 -849 CE). (Sourced from: Review of The Muslim West and the Mediterranean, Issues 31–34, Association for the Study of the Humanities in North Africa, 1981)
- Abd Allah al-Qaysi: Abu Muhammad Abd Allah ibn Muhammad ibn Qasim ibn Hilal ibn Yazid ibn Imran al-Absi al-Qaysi was an early Muslim jurist and theologian. He died in 885 or 886.
- Al-Tutili: Abu'l-ʿAbbās (or Abū Dj̲aʿfar) Aḥmad ibn ʿAbd Allāh ibn Hurayra al-ʿUtbī (or al-Qaysī) al-Absi (died 1126), nicknamed al-Aʿmā al-Tuṭīlī or the Blind Poet of Tudela, was an Andalusian mūwallad poet who composed in Arabic.
- Sidi Khaled ibn Sinan al Absi (or Sidi Khaled ibn Sounan Elabsi): A prominent Muslim holy man. The Algerian town in which he is buried is named after him.

=== Modern ===
- Ali ibn Salim Al-Ajiylan Al-Diqbasii: The Speaker of the Arab Parliament and member of the Kuwait National Assembly where he represents Kuwait's Fourth District. He is a member of the Al-Rashaydah tribe. He maintains a good relationship with Kuwait's royal family, the House of Sabah.
- Mabrouk Mubarak Salim: Sudan's State Minister of Transport and Roads. This prominent and highly respected individual is the founder of the Sudanese Rashaida Free Lions and the leader of the Rashaida tribe in Sudan.
- Talal Al-Absi: A Saudi Arabian football player who currently plays as a defender for Al-Taawoun FC.
- Hassan Al-Absi: Hassan Al-Absi (born 1966) is a Saudi Arabian former cyclist. He competed in the individual road race and team time trial events at the 1984 Summer Olympics.
- Ahmed Saad Al Rashidi: Kuwaiti footballer currently playing with Al Arabi of Kuwait.
- Fahad Al-Rashidi: Kuwaiti football player. He currently plays for Kuwaiti Premier League side Al Arabi.
- Fahad Al-Rashidi: Saudi football player who plays for Al-Raed FC.
- Nasser Al-Duwailah: Politician and member of the Kuwaiti National Assembly, representing the fourth district. Former army commander and member of the Al-Rashaydah tribe.
- Noor Al-Rashidi: A Saudi football player.

== See also ==
- Arabian tribes that interacted with Muhammad

== Bibliography ==
- Crone, Patricia (1980). Slaves on Horses: The Evolution of the Islamic Polity (1980 ed.). Cambridge: Cambridge University Press. ISBN 978-0521229616.
- Elad, Amikam (1999). "The Southern Golan in the Early Muslim Period: The Significance of Two Newly Discovered Milestones of Ἁbd al-Malik". Der Islam. 76 (1): 33–88. doi:10.1515/islm.1999.76.1.33. S2CID 161322620.
- Hillenbrand, Carole, ed. (1989). The History of al-Ṭabarī, Volume XXVI: The Waning of the Umayyad Caliphate: Prelude to Revolution, A.D. 738–744/A.H. 121–126. SUNY Series in Near Eastern Studies. Albany, New York: State University of New York Press. ISBN 978-0-88706-810-2.
- Landau-Tasseron, Ella (1997). "Unearthing a Pre-Islamic Arabian Prophet". Jerusalem Studies in Arabic and Islam. 21: 42–61.
- Le Strange, G. (1890). Palestine Under the Moslems: A Description of Syria and the Holy Land from A.D. 650 to 1500. Committee of the Palestine Exploration Fund.
- Zakkar, Suhayl (1971). The Emirate of Aleppo: 1004–1094. Beirut: Dar al-Amanah. OCLC 759803726.
