= Ghatafan =

Ancient Arab tribe northeast of Medina, Arabia

Banu Ghaṭafān بنو غطفان
- Qaysite Arab tribe
- Nisba: Al-Ghatafani
- Location: Arabia
- Descended from: Ghaṭafān ibn Sa'd ibn Qays
- Parent tribe: Qays
- Branches: Rayth; Dhubyan; Fazara; Murra; Tha'labah; Abs; Anmar; Ashja'
- Religion: Polytheism (pre-630); Islam (post 630)

Map of the Arabian Peninsula in 600 AD, showing the various Arab tribes and their areas of settlement. The Lakhmids (yellow) formed an Arab monarchy as clients of the Sasanian Empire, while the Ghassanids (red) formed an Arab monarchy as clients of the Roman Empire A map published by the British academic Harold Dixon during World War I, showing the presence of the Arab tribes in West Asia, 1914

The Ghaṭafān (Arabic: غطفان) were an Arab tribal confederation originally based northeast of Medina. The main branches of the Ghatafan were the tribes of Banu Abs, Banu Dhubyan and Ashja'. They were one of the Arab tribes that interacted with Muhammad. They are notable for allying themselves with the Quraysh in the Battle of the Trench.

== Origins and branches ==
The Ghatafan were a Bedouin tribal grouping that inhabited the Wadi al-Rumma area of Najd between the Hejaz mountains and Jabal Shammar. According to Arab genealogical tradition, the progenitor of the tribe was Ghaṭafān ibn Saʾd ibn Qays ʿAylān, making it a part of the larger Qays tribe. The etymology or meaning of Ghatafan is not known.

The main branches of the Ghatafan were the following:

- The Banu Ashja, who inhabited the westernmost area of the Ghatafan's tribal territory. Zahir Ibn Haram was a companion and representative of Muhammad from the tribe of Banu Ashja.
- The Banu Dhubyan, who were descendants of Dhubyān ibn Baghīd ibn Rayth ibn Ghaṭafān. They inhabited the area east of the Banu Ashja and included the major subtribes of the Banu Murra, the Banu Fazara and the Tha’laba.
- The Banu Abs, descendants of ʿAbs ibn Baghīd ibn Rayth ibn Ghaṭafān, inhabited the area east of the Banu Dhubyan.
- The Anmar, who inhabited the Qassim region of Najd.

== Conflict with Muhammad ==
They were involved in several military conflicts with Muhammad. The first was the Invasion of Dhi Amr occurred directly after the Invasion of Sawiq in the year 3 A.H of the Islamic calendar, September 624. The expedition was ordered by Muhammad after he received intelligence that the Banu Muharib and Banu Talabah tribes, were planning to raid the outskirts of Medina. Therefore, Muhammad launched a preemptive strike with 450 men.

Another conflict they were involved in was the Expedition of Dhat al-Riqa where Muhammad ordered an attack on the tribe because he received news that they were assembling at Dhat al-Riqa with a suspicious purpose.

This was followed by the Invasion of Dumatul Jandal. Muhammad ordered his men to invade Duma, because Muhammad received intelligence that some tribes there were involved in highway robbery and preparing to attack Medina itself This happened in July 626.

Then in November or Dec 629, the Expedition of Abu Qatadah ibn Rab'i al-Ansari (Khadirah) took place. With the goal of attacking the Ghatafan tribe because he heard that they were amassing troops and were still outside the "domain of Islam"

== List ==
- Nuaym ibn Masud
- Banu Abs
- Bani Rasheed
- Rashaida people
- Mutayr

== See also ==
- List of expeditions of Muhammad

== Bibliography ==
- Fück, J. W. (1965). "Ghaṭafān". In Lewis, B.; Pellat, Ch. & Schacht, J. (eds.). The Encyclopaedia of Islam, Second Edition. Volume II: C–G. Leiden: E. J. Brill. pp. 1023–1024. OCLC 495469475.
