= Ishmaelites =

Abrahamic tradition of tribal identity

Ishmaelites بَنِي إِسْمَاعِيل
- Map of Ishmaelite tribes in Pre-Islamic Arabia
- Ethnicity: Arabs
- Location: Northern Arabia, Western Arabia (Hejaz), Central Arabia (Najd)
- Descended from: Ishmael (the son of Abraham)
- Language: Old Arabic

The Ishmaelites (Hebrew: יִשְׁמְעֵאלִים, romanized: Yīšməʿēʾlīm; Arabic: بَنِي إِسْمَاعِيل, romanized: Banī Ismā'īl, lit. 'sons of Ishmael') were a collection of various Arab tribes, tribal confederations and small kingdoms described in Abrahamic tradition as being descended from and named after Ishmael.

According to the Quran, Ishmael was a prophet and was the first son of Abraham and the Egyptian Hagar.

According to the Book of Genesis in the Bible, Ishmael had one daughter and twelve sons, the "twelve princes" mentioned in Genesis 17:20. In Islamic tradition, this gave rise to the "Twelve Tribes of Ishmael", Arab tribes from which the early Muslims were descended. In Jewish tradition, the Twelve Tribes of Israel were descended from Abraham and his wife Sarah's son, Isaac, via Isaac's son Jacob. These traditions are accepted by both Islam and Judaism.

Genesis and 1 Chronicles describe the Qedarites as a tribe descended from the second son of Ishmael, Kedar. Some Abrahamic scholars described the historic tribe of Nabataeans as descendants of Nebaioth based on the similarity of sounds, but others reject this connection. Different Islamic groups assign the ancestry of the Islamic prophet Muhammad either to Kedar, or to Nebaioth.

Assyrian and Babylonian inscriptions refer to the Ishmaelites as Sumu'ilu, a tribal confederation that would take control of the incense trade route during the dominance of the Neo-Assyrian Empire to the north. Christian Frevel holds that while there certainly existed a tribe of Sumu'il in the eighth century BCE, it is possible that the biblical tradition describing the existence of Ishmaelites in the Middle Bronze Age is unhistorical and emerged no earlier than the eighth or seventh centuries.

== Hebrew Bible ==
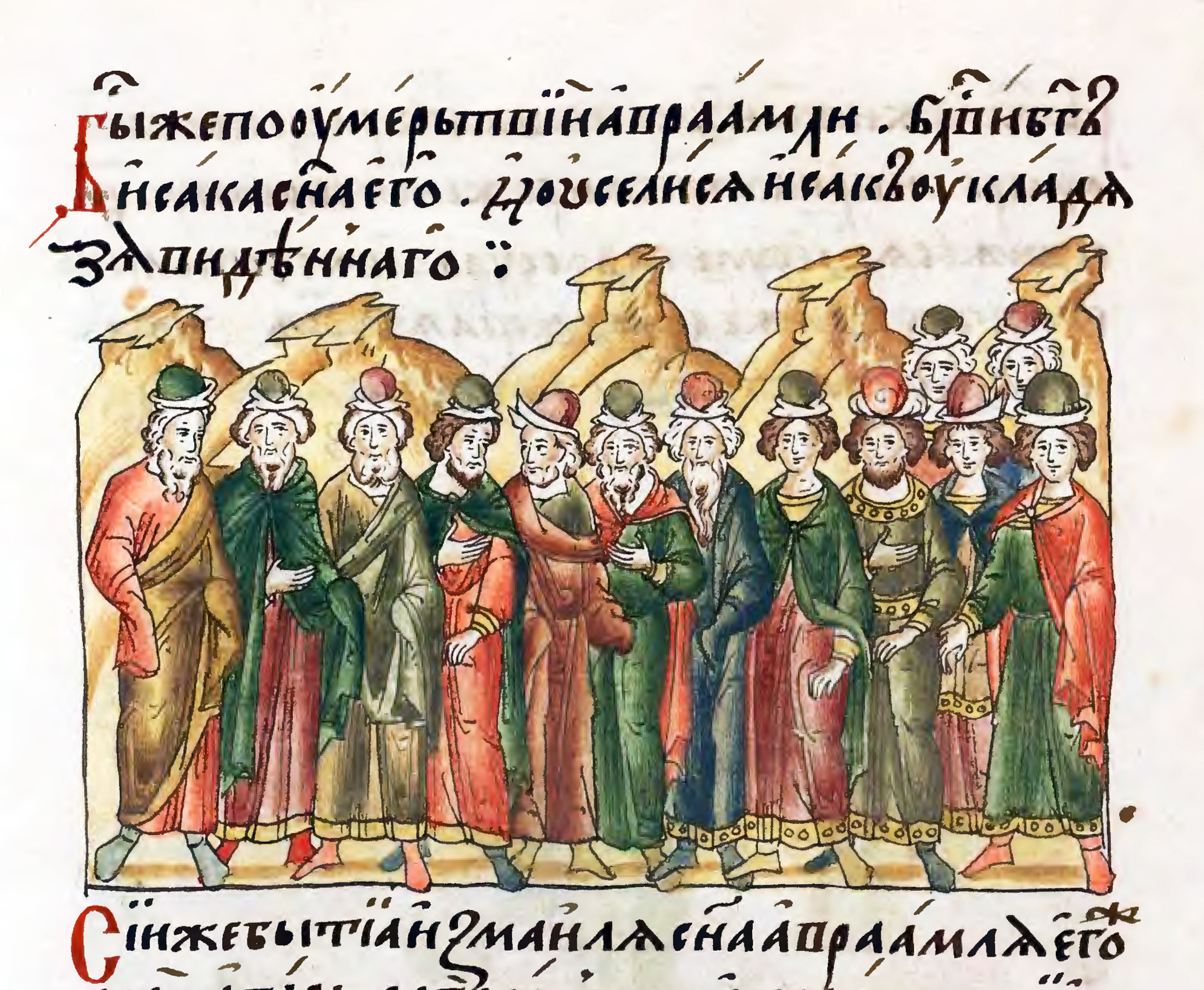
Ishmael's sons (1560s miniature)

According to the Book of Genesis, Abraham's first wife was named Sarah and her Egyptian slave was named Hagar. However, Sarah could not conceive. In chapter 16, Sarah (then Sarai) gave her slave Hagar in marriage to Abraham, in order that Abraham might have an heir.

And Sarai Abram's wife took Hagar her maid the Egyptian ... and gave her to her husband Abram to be his wife.

Hagar conceived Ishmael from Abraham, and the Ishmaelites descend from him. After Abraham pleaded with God for Ishmael to live under his blessing, chapter 17 states:

But as for Ishmael, I have heard thee: behold I have blessed him, and will make him fruitful, and will multiply him exceedingly; twelve princes shall he beget, and I will make him a great nation.

Chapter 25 lists his sons:

And these are the names of the sons of Ishmael, by their names, according to their generations: the firstborn of Ishmael
Nebaioth; and Kedar, and Adbeel, and Mibsam,
And Mishma, and Dumah, and Massa, Hadad, and Tema, Jetur, Naphish, and Kedemah.

According to the documentary hypothesis, Genesis 25 would have been added during the Persian Period by the Priestly source, who attributed the known Ishmaelite (Shumu'ilu) Tribes as the names of the sons of Ishmael. However, the name and narrative of Ishmael found in other parts of Genesis would antedate this by centuries. The Hebrew Bible already contained the story of Ishmael, and it would later come across Ishmaelite Tribes, and they would invent names for Ishmael's sons, named after the various tribes in the Ishmaelite Confederacy.

Family of Ishmaelites

Abraham

Hagar
Ishmael
1. Nebaioth; 2. Kedar; 3. Adbeel; 4. Mibsam; 5. Mishma; 6. Dumah; 7. Massa; 8. Hadad; 9. Tema; 10. Jetur; 11. Naphish; 12. Kedemah

Comparing aspects of the descendants of Ishmael and Israel (Jacob):

| Aspect | Descendants of Ishmael | Descendants of Israel (Jacob) |
|---|---|---|
| Founding Patriarch | Ishmael | Jacob (renamed Israel) |
| Number of Sons | Twelve sons | Twelve sons (from different wives and concubines) |
| Promised Destiny | Promised to become a great nation; described as "a wild donkey of a man" whose hand would be against everyone and everyone's hand against him. (Genesis 16:11-12) | Promised to become a great nation; bearer of the covenant promises made to Abraham (Genesis 35:11-12) |
| Role in Biblical Narrative | Played various roles including traders, allies, and adversaries | Central to the biblical narrative, forming the foundation of the nation of Israel and playing key roles in biblical history |
| Covenant Relationship | Descendants of Abraham through Hagar | Descendants of Abraham through Sarah and other wives/concubines |
| Geographical Influence | Inhabited regions primarily in the Arabian Peninsula | Settled in the Promised Land of Canaan (later known as Israel) |
| Relationship with God | Not explicitly depicted in the Bible | Chosen people, bearers of the Abrahamic covenant, recipients of divine promises (Genesis 17:7-8) |
| Genealogical Listings | Genesis 25:12-18; 1 Chronicles 1:29-31 | Genesis 35:22-26; Various genealogies throughout the Bible |
| Impact on History and Theology | Contributed to the ethnic and cultural diversity of the ancient Near East | Played a significant role in shaping biblical history and theology |
| Inheritance of Covenant Promises | Received blessings from God but not specified as inheritors of the covenant promises given to Abraham's descendants through Isaac | Inherited the covenant promises made to Abraham, including land, numerous descendants, and divine protection (Genesis 28:13-15) |
| Tribal Structure | Ishmaelite tribes | Twelve tribes of Israel |

== Islamic narrative ==
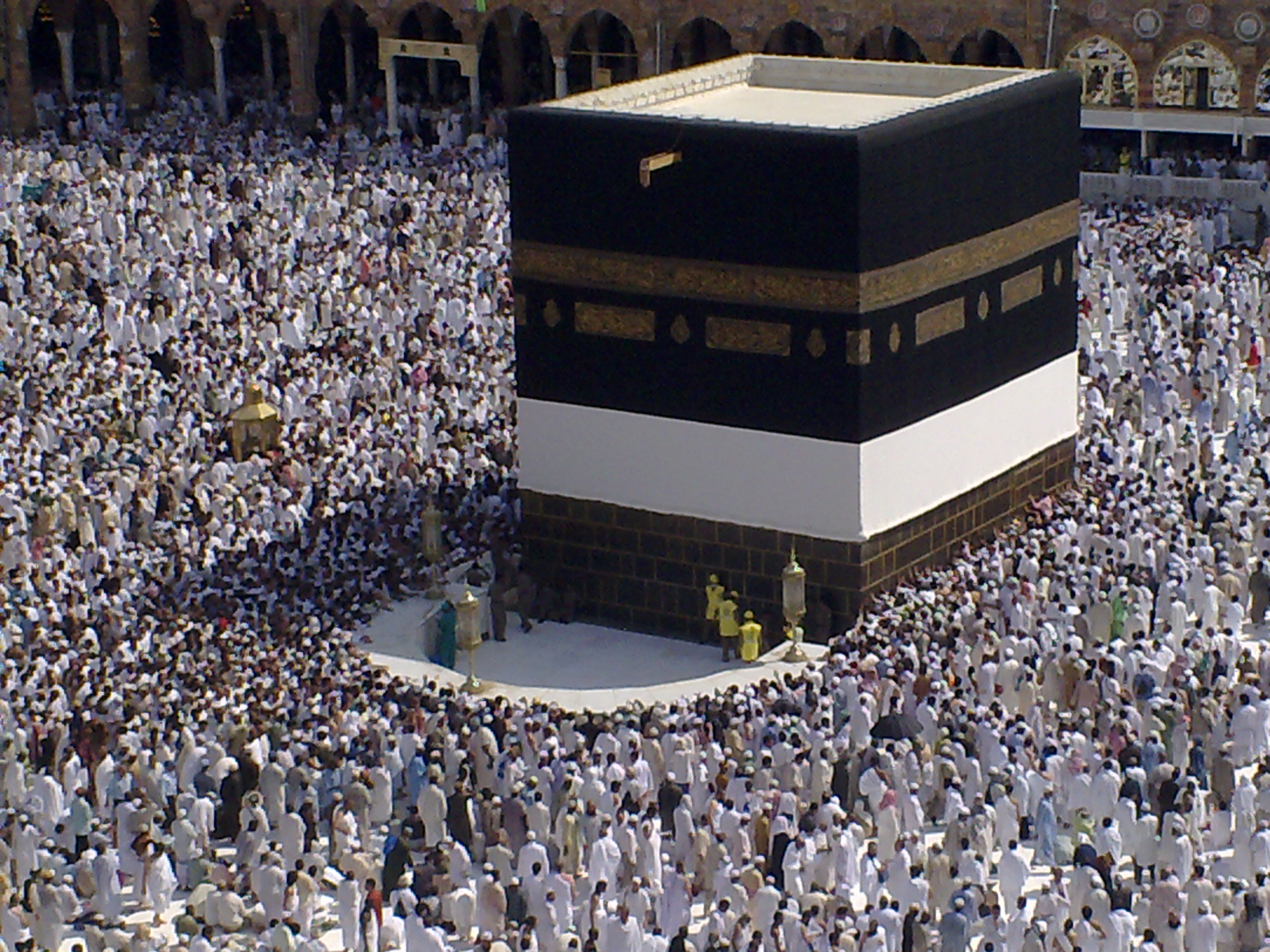
The semicircular Hijr Ismail wall, associated with Ibrahim (Abraham), Ishmael and their building of the Kaaba (now part of the Great Mosque of Mecca)

According to the Quran, "Allah has gifted all of Ishmael, Alyasa, Yunus and Lut a favor above the nations. With some of their forefathers and their offspring and their brethren, We chose them and guided them unto a straight path". (Quran 6:86). Ibrahim and Hajar bore the prophetic child, who was named Ishmael by Allah through one of his angels. God ordered Ibrahim to bring Ishmael and Hajar to present-day Mecca. He prayed for them after leaving them, saying: "O our Lord! I have made some of my offspring to dwell in an uncultivatable valley by Your Sacred House (the Kaaba in Mecca) in order, O our Lord, that they may perform As-Ṣalāt. So fill some hearts among men with love towards them, and (O Allah) provide them with fruits so that they may give thanks."

Ishmael and Hagar were very thirsty, and Hagar ran between the hills of Safa and Marwa in search of water for her son. After her seventh run between the hills, an angel appeared before her. He helped them, saying that God heard Ishmael's cry and would provide them with water; Hajar stopped the water with stones. Muhammad said, "May Allah forgive Hajar if she doesn't stop the water, there was a great water fountain." A group of people passed by, and saw the well and Hajar and Ishmael sitting there. They asked Hagar for some of the water from the well; she agreed, and an Arab tribe began there. Ishmael grew up there and learned Arabic from the tribe while waiting for his father. When Ibrahim arrived in Marwa, he learned that his son was alive. When young Ishmael saw his father, he ran to him and they embraced.

Allah (God) decided to test Ibrahim again, and he dreamed two nights in a row of sacrificing Ishmael. Ibrahim blindfolded himself, because he could not bear to see his son suffer, then he placed the knife on Ishmael neck and wield the knife, when he opened his blindfold he found Ishmael standing next to him and instead of Ishmael there was a lamb. Ibrahim knew it was a test from Allah and then he received a command from Allah to rebuild the mosque for Ishmael's tribe which had been constructed by Adam, the first Islamic prophet, and Ibrahim and Ishmael began building the Kaaba. Ibrahim built the mosque, and Ishmael provided the stones, When the walls were built and the roof was almost complete, Ibrahim stood on the miraculous small stone to finish the roof.

== Other traditions ==
=== Samaritan Asaṭīr ===
The Samaritan book Asaṭīr adds:

And after the death of Abraham, Ishmael reigned twenty-seven years;
And all the children of Nebaot ruled for one year in the lifetime of Ishmael;
And for thirty years after his death from the river of Egypt to the river Euphrates; and they built Mecca. (Note: This text has been dated by Moses Gaster to the third century BCE, but A.D. Crown writes that its Aramaic resembles more the language used by the scholar Ab Hisda of Tyre in the 11th century.)

=== Josephus' Antiquities ===
Josephus also lists the sons and states that they "inhabit the lands which are between Euphrates and the Red Sea, the name of which country is Nabathæa".

=== Targum Onkelos ===
The Targum Onkelos annotates Genesis 25:16, describing the extent of their settlements: "And they dwelt from Hindekaia [India] unto Chalutsa, which is by the side of Mizraim [Egypt], from thy going up towards Arthur [Assyria]."

=== Kebra Nagast ===
The 14th century Kebra Nagast says "And therefore the children of Ishmael became kings over Tereb, and over Kebet, and over Nôbâ, and Sôba, and Kuergue, and Kîfî, and Mâkâ, and Môrnâ, and Fînḳânâ, and 'Arsîbânâ, and Lîbâ, and Mase'a, for they were the seed of Shem."

== Historical records using the term ==
The Qedarite Kingdom

Assyrian and Babylonian royal inscriptions and North Arabian inscriptions from 9th to 6th century BC, mention the king of Qedar, sometimes as Arab and sometimes as Ishmaelite. The names "Nabat, Kedar, Abdeel, Dumah, Massa, and Teman" were mentioned in the Assyrian royal inscriptions as Arabian tribes. Jesur is mentioned in Greek inscriptions in the first century BC. Assyrian and Babylonian Inscriptions have referred to the Ishmaelites as "Sumu'ilu" and Ernst Knauf had written that Yisma'el is a typical West Semitic Personal name found in texts from the third millennium BC to pre-Islamic Arabic in the first half of the first millennium CE. He argues that the North Arabian "Sama'il" would be rendered "Shumu'il" by Assyrians, and would have the same meaning as "Yisma'el" and hence the Shumu'ilu tribes would be descended to an ancestor named Yisma'el, which is anglicized as Ishmael. One of the Inscriptions mentioning the Ishmaelites is Sennacherib's Annals, in column vii line 96.

The Ishmaelite Confederacy did have differences. The Qedar Tribe's political center was Duma (Dumat Al-Jandal), which was also the cultic residence of the six deities of the "king of the Arabs", as John Travis Noble writes. Tayma's pantheon was quite different from that of Duma, which seems to be the capital of the Ishmaelites, even though Tema appears as a son of Ishmael in Genesis 25. Noble then writes that it is unlikely that all twelve tribes associated with the sons of Ishmael were in the Ishmaelite Confederacy simultaneously, and tribes joined in one instance may not be a part of it in another instance, and they sometimes may have fought each other despite the association with the wider Ishmaelite Confederacy. However, the term "Ishmaelites" or rather "Sumu'ilu" disappears from documentary sources as the Assyrian Empire fell. However, the individual tribes and members kept going on, as there are references from the time Cyrus the Great came to power of the kings living in tents. Southern Palestine and the surrounding areas were inhabited considerably by Nabataeans, who had been entrenched there as early as the 6th century BC. According to Knauf, this expansion caused the tribes to decrease contact, and this caused the Ishmaelite Confederacy to end, not any military defeat.

== Arabic genealogical traditions ==
Medieval Arab genealogists divided Arabs into three groups:

- "Ancient Arabs", tribes that had vanished or been destroyed, such as ʿĀd and Thamud, often mentioned in the Quran as examples of God's power to destroy those who did not believe and follow their prophets and messengers.
- "Pure Arabs" of South Arabia, descending from Qahtan son of Eber (ʿĀbir). Some of the Qahtanites (Qahtanis) are said to have migrated from the land of Yemen following the destruction of the Marib Dam (sadd Ma'rib).
- The "Arabized Arabs" (mustaʿribah) of central, western, and North Arabia, descending from Ishmael the elder son of Abraham through his descendant Adnan. Such as the ancient tribe of Quda'a and Hawazin, or the modern-day tribes of Otaibah and Mutayr.

Abu Ja'far al-Baqir (676–743 AD) wrote that his father Ali ibn Husayn Zayn al-Abidin informed him that Muhammad had said: "The first whose tongue spoke in clear Arabic was Ishmael, when he was fourteen years old." Hisham ibn al-Kalbi (737–819 AD) established a genealogical link between Ishmael and Muhammad using writings and the ancient oral traditions of the Arabs. His book, Jamharat al-Nasab ("The Abundance of Kinship"), seems to posit that the people known as "Arabs" (of his time) were all descendants of Ishmael. Ibn Kathir (1301–1373) writes (translated): "All the Arabs of the Hejaz are descendants of Nebaioth and Qedar." Medieval Jewish sources also usually identified Qedar with Arabs and Muslims. (Note: Herodotus described the relationship between the Qedarites and the Persians as follows: "they did not yield the obedience of slaves to the Persians, but were united to them by friendship for having given Cambyses passage into Egypt, which the Persians could not enter without the consent of the Arabs.") According to author and scholar Irfan Shahîd, while Western scholars viewed this kind of "genealogical Ishmaelism" with suspicion, the concept can be supported for certain groups among the Arabs,

Genealogical Ishmaelism was viewed with suspicion as a late Islamic fabrication because of the confusion in Islamic times which made it such a capacious term as to include the inhabitants of the south as well as the north of the Arabian Peninsula. But short of this extravagance, the concept is much more modest in its denotation, and in the sober sources, it applies only to certain groups among the Arabs of pre-Islamic times. Some important statements to this effect were made by Muhammad when he identified some Arabs as Ishmaelites and others as not.

Ishmaelism, in this more limited definition, holds that Ishmael was both an important religious figure and eponymous ancestor for some of the Arabs of western Arabia. Prominence is given in Arab genealogical accounts to the first two of Ishmael's twelve sons, Nebaioth (Arabic: نبيت, Nabīt) and Qedar (Arabic: قيدار, Qaydār), who are also prominently featured in the Genesis account. It is likely that they and their tribes lived in northwestern Arabia and were historically the most important of the twelve Ishmaelite tribes.

Muslims believe that the first person to speak Arabic clearly was Ishmael: "Isma'il grew up among the Jurhum (an Arabic-speaking tribe), learning the pure Arabic tongue from them. When grown-up, he successively married two ladies from the Jurhum tribe, the second wife being the daughter of Mudad ibn 'Amr, leader of the Jurhum tribe."

In accounts tracing the ancestry of Muhammad back to Ma'ad (and from there to Adam), Arab scholars alternate, with some citing the line as through Nebaioth, others Qedar. Many Muslim scholars see Isaiah 42 (21:13–17) as predicting the coming of a servant of God who is associated with Qedar and interpret this as a reference to Muhammad.

== See also ==
- History of the Arabs
- Adnanites
- Hagarenes
- Israelites
- Magarites
- Muhajirun
- Saracen
