= Mausoleum of Prophet Qeydar =

Shi'ite holy place in Zanjan, Iran

- آرامگاه قیدار نبی
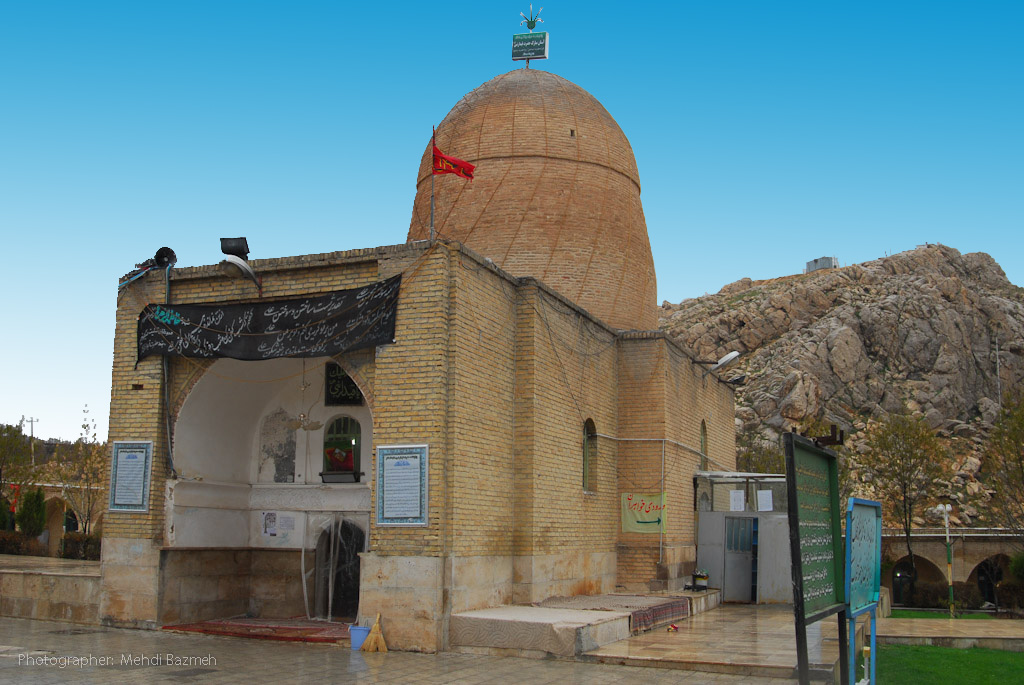

- Location of the mausoleum in Iran

Religion
- Affiliation: Shia Islam
- Ecclesiastical or organisational status: Mausoleum
- Status: Active

Location
- Location: Qeydar, Khodabandeh County, Zanjan province
- Country: Iran
- Interactive map of Mausoleum of Prophet Qeydar
- Coordinates: 36°06′59″N 48°35′08″E

Architecture
- Type: Islamic architecture
- Style: Ilkhanid
- Founder: Bulughan Khatun (wife of Ghazan)
- Established: 1319 CE

Specifications
- Dome: 1
- Site area: c.120.35 m^{2} (1,295.4 sq ft)
- Shrine: 1: Qedar
- Materials: Brick, stone
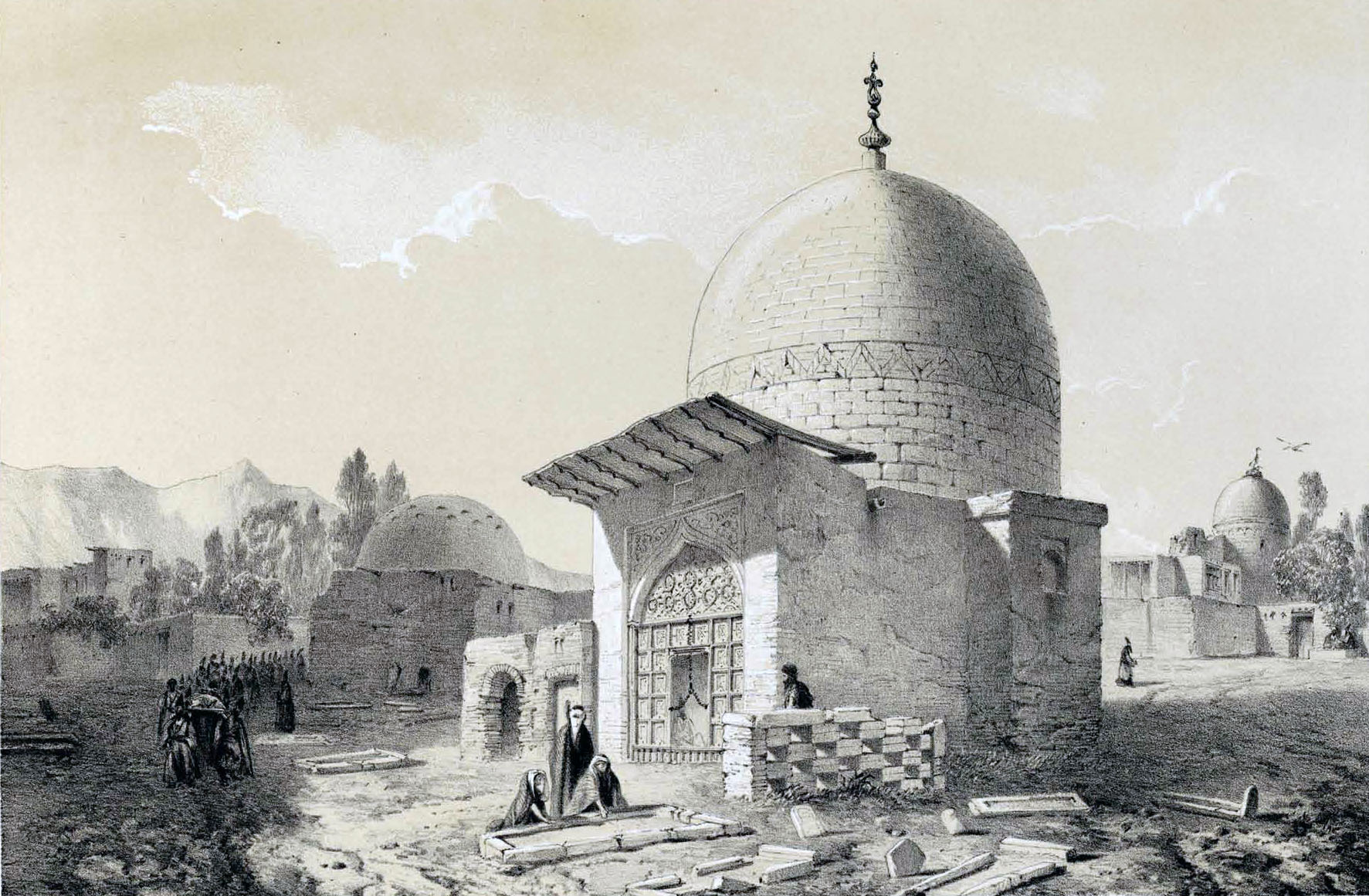
- An illustration of the tomb of Qedar by Eugéne Flandin, misidentified as an Imamzadeh structure

Iran National Heritage List
- Official name: Mausoleum of Prophet Qeydar
- Type: Mausoleum
- Designated: 1938
- Reference no.: 321
- Conservation organization: Cultural Heritage, Handicrafts and Tourism Organization of Iran

The Mausoleum of Prophet Qeydar (Persian: آرامگاه قیدار نبی) is a Shi'ite mausoleum located in the city of Qeydar in Khodabandeh County, in the province of Zanjan, Iran. It is believed by locals to be the burial place of Qedar, the son of Ishmael.

The mausoleum was added to the Iran National Heritage List in 1938 and is administered by the Cultural Heritage, Handicrafts and Tourism Organization of Iran.

== History ==
The original structure existed before the 14th century but was badly ruined. The present structure was built in 1319 under the orders of Bulughan Khatun, the wife of the Ilkhanid ruler Ghazan. In 1350, the building was restored and renovated with funding from a Sufi religious leader named Timur Khan Soltaniyeh. In modern times, between 1901 and 1902, the governor of Zanjan, Jahanshah Khan, restored the mausoleum.

== Architecture ==
The mausoleum of Prophet Qeydar has an area of c.120.35 square metres (1,295.4 sq ft), in a rectangular shape, its central chamber topped by a brick dome. The entrance is on the southern facade. On the southern side of the shabestan is an early Nastaliq inscription dating from 1319, which details the construction of the new building by Bulughan Khatun.

Walnut wood embedded with gold and silver is used to construct the zarih that encloses the grave of Qedar in the central chamber of the mausoleum. Islamic calligraphy can be seen engraved in the tomb chamber as well. Aside from housing a tomb and prayer hall, the building includes a hostel for pilgrims as well as a basement that was used to rear cattle. There are rooms for the clerics to hold meetings.

== Significance ==
The mausoleum is believed to entomb the remains of Qedar ben Ishmael, who was one of the sons of Ishmael and the progenitor of the Qedarites in biblical tradition. In Islamic tradition, which accepts the biblical narrative, adds on that Qedar is an ancestor of the prophet Muhammad, hence the importance of this tomb. A historical copy of the Qur'an is also stored within the building; it is written on papyrus before being bound with a leather cover.

== Gallery ==
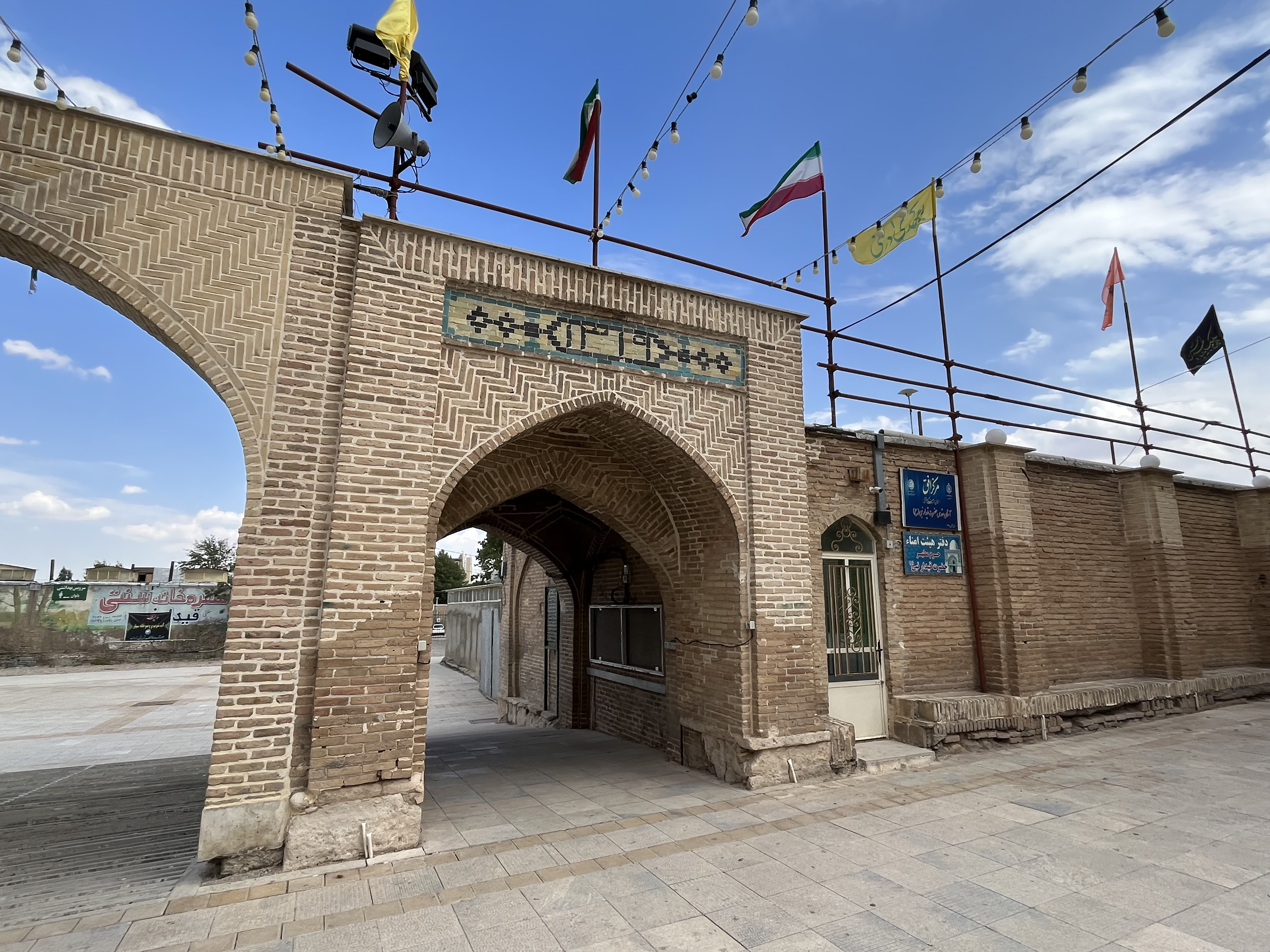
One of the arched gateways when viewed from the inside

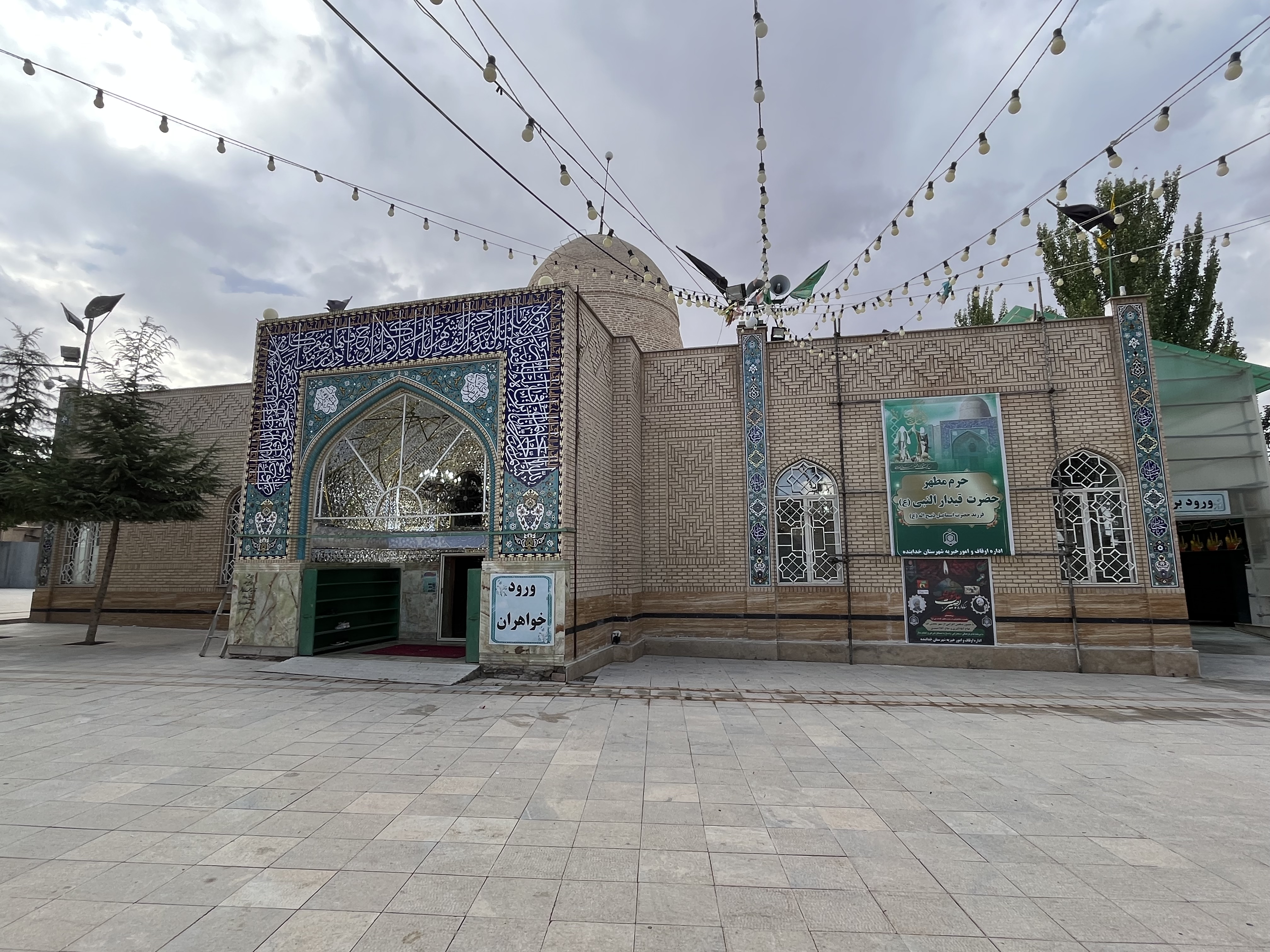
Southern facade of the mausoleum

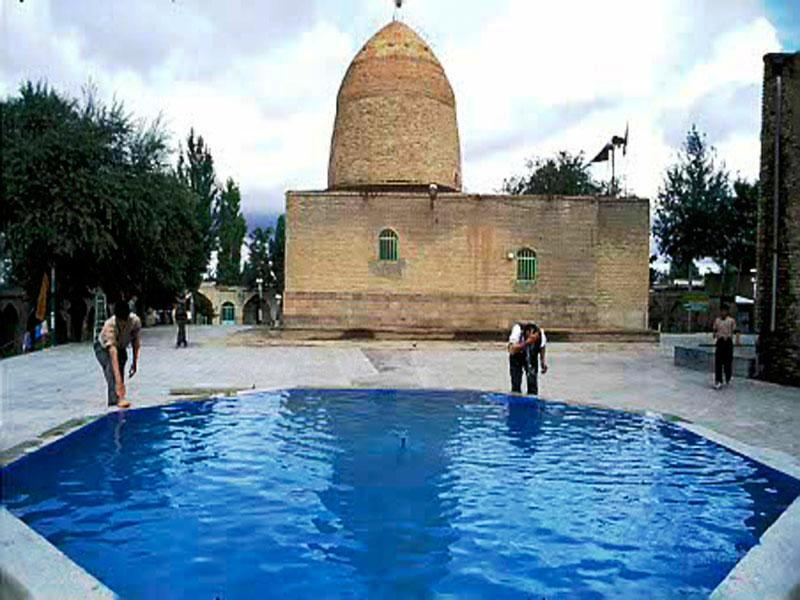
A swimming pool in the foreground of the mausoleum

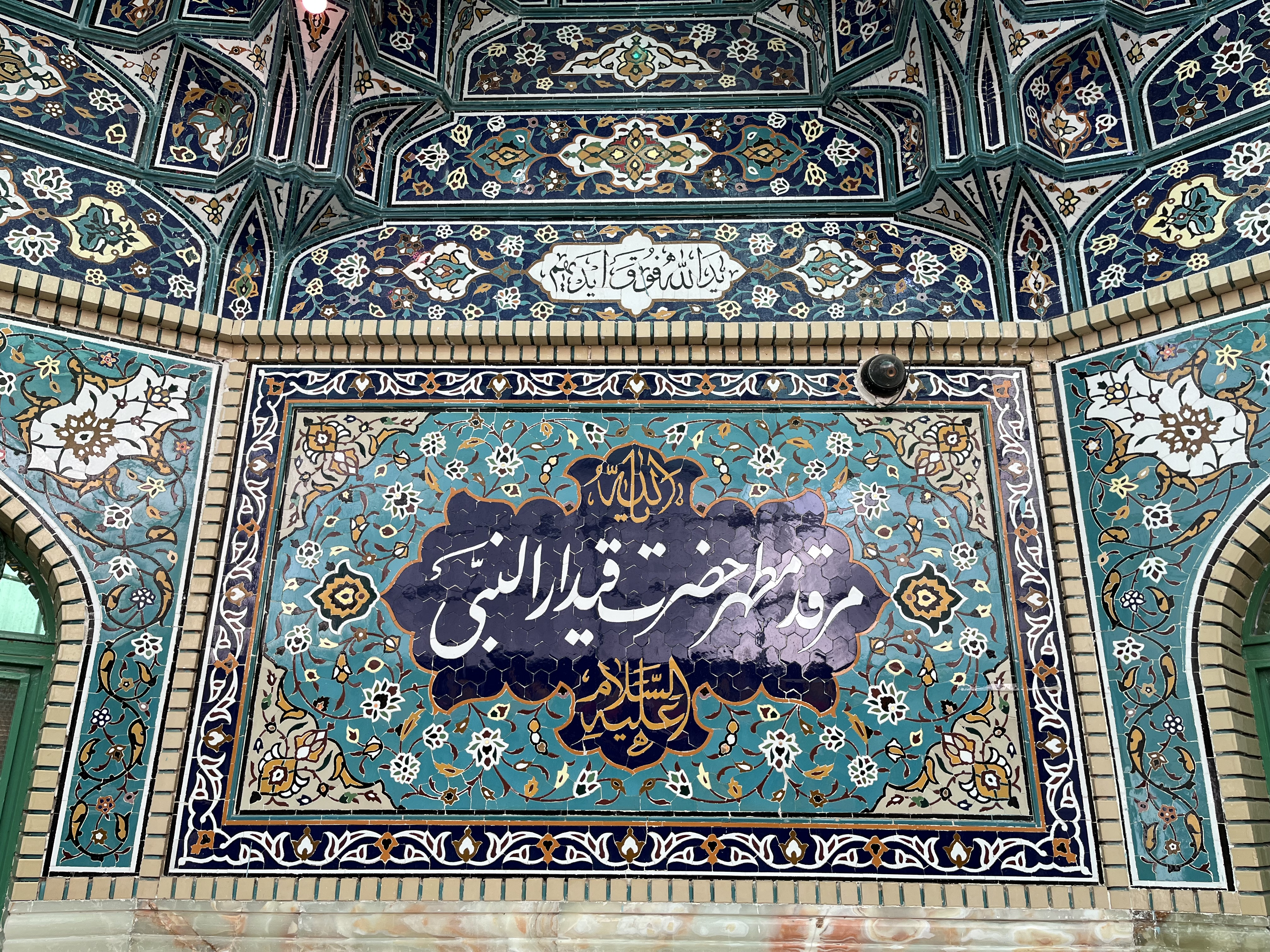
Nastaliq inscription in the mausoleum

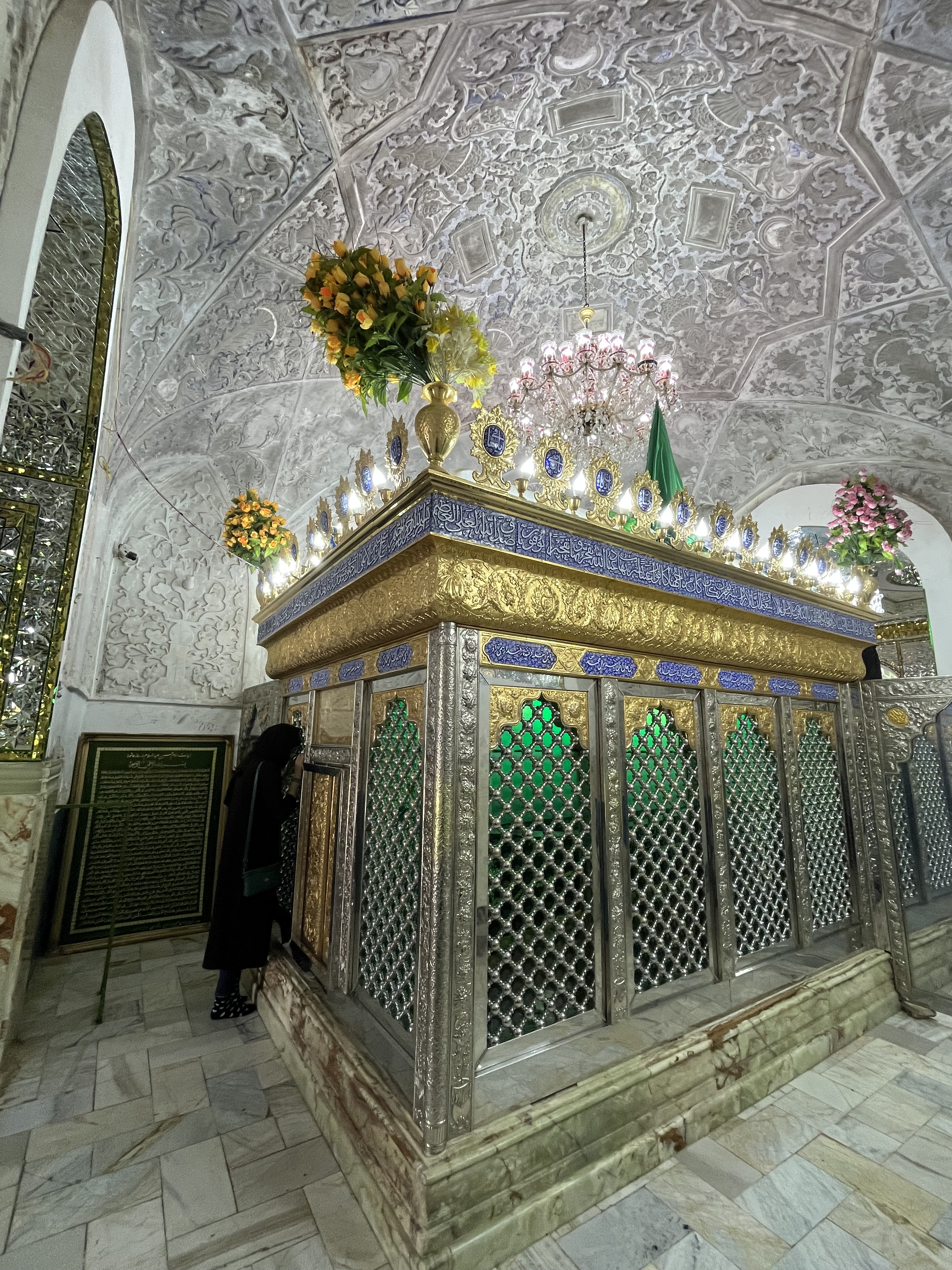
The tomb of Qedar within the central chamber of the building

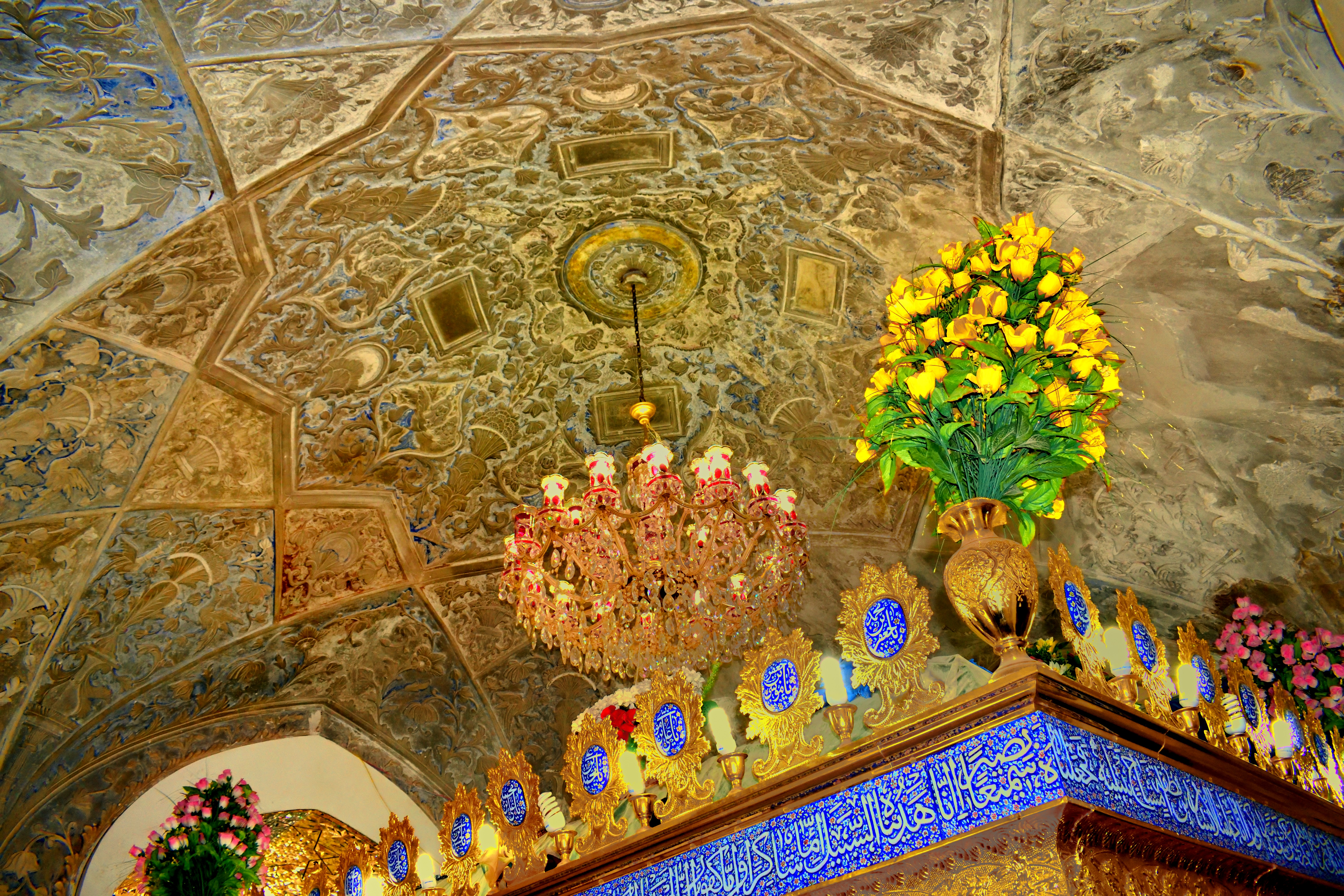
Decor and carvings underneath the central dome; the top of the zarih is visible

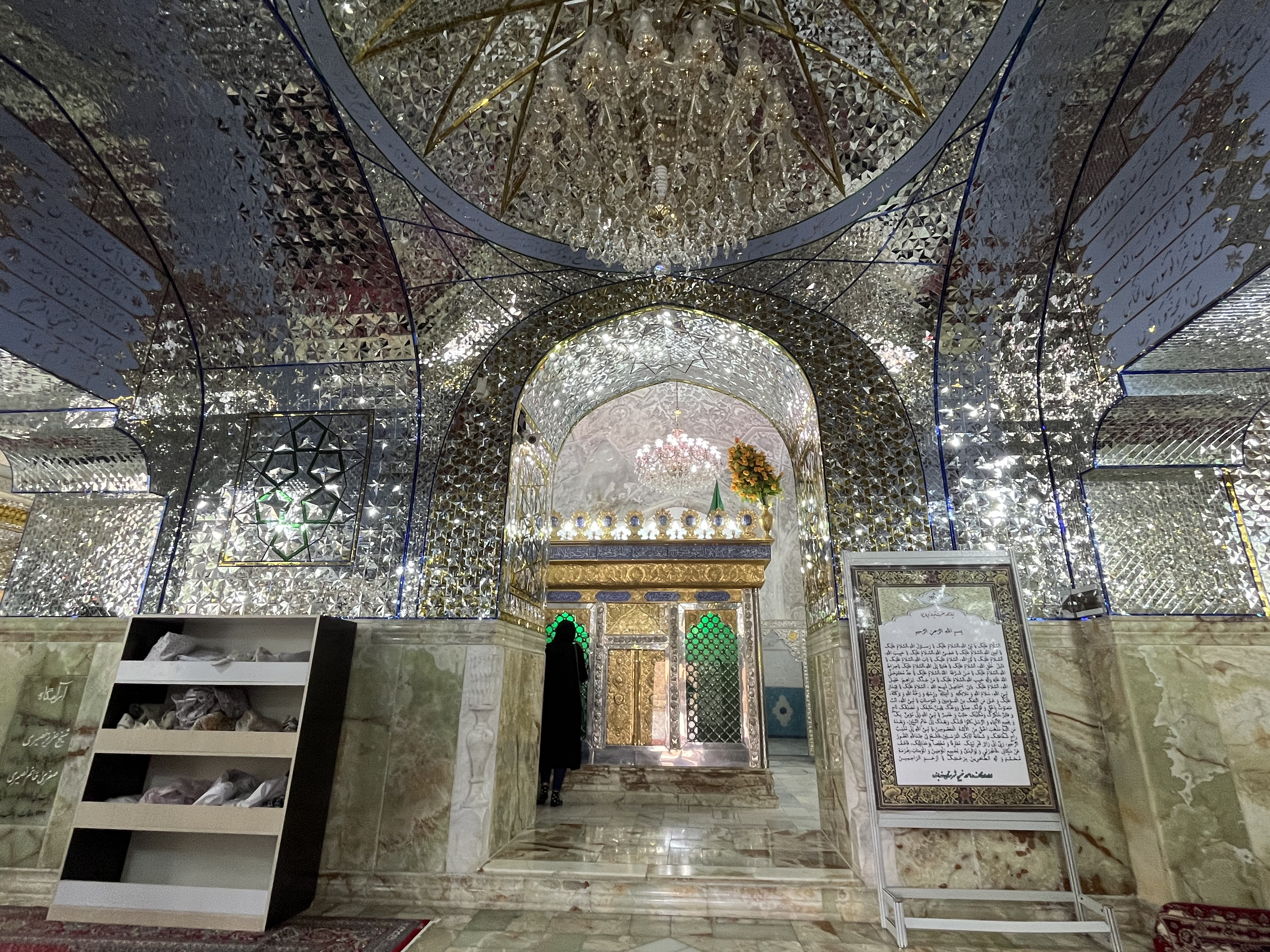
Entrance to central chamber

== See also ==
- Tomb of Esther and Mordechai
- Tomb of Samuel
- List of burial places of Abrahamic figures
- List of mausoleums in Iran
- Shia Islam in Iran
