= List of Islamic prophets buried in Iran =

This is a list of prophets buried in Iran.

East Azerbaijan Province, Iran

- Gurjee (جرجیس) – Jolfa city, village of Shah Golfarak valley, Kaghi Key
- Younis (یونس) – Marand County

Isfahan province

- Isaiah (شعیا) – Isfahan; Some Muslims believe buried in Isaiah mausoleum which is part of the Imamzadeh Ismail religious complex located in the Old Jewish Quarter, Isfahan, Iran.
- Serah – Pir Bakran, near Esfahan, Iran

Tehran province

- Samuel – Samuel's tomb is located 30 km outside Saveh City, Iran

Khuzestan province

- Daniel (دانیال) – Susa, in southern Iran, at a site known as Shush-e Daniyal

Zanjan province

- Qedarite (قیدار) – Qeydar, Zanjan, Iran

Semnan

- Jeremiah (ارمیا) – the city of Shahrood, Miami, the village of Jeremiah, some claim Harris County, West Benghazi, Gigah Village.

Qazvin province

- Salam, Solum, Al-Qiya and Sohuli – Peighambarieh shrine, Qazvin.

Golestan province

- Khalid ibn Sinan (خالد بن سنان) – Gonbad Kavous city, Gachi Sou village, cemetery and shrine of Khalid Nabi

Hamedan province

- Habakkuk (حیقوق) – located at Toyserkan, Iran.
