= Qeydar =

City in the Zanjan Province of Iran

Qeydar Persian: قيدار
- City
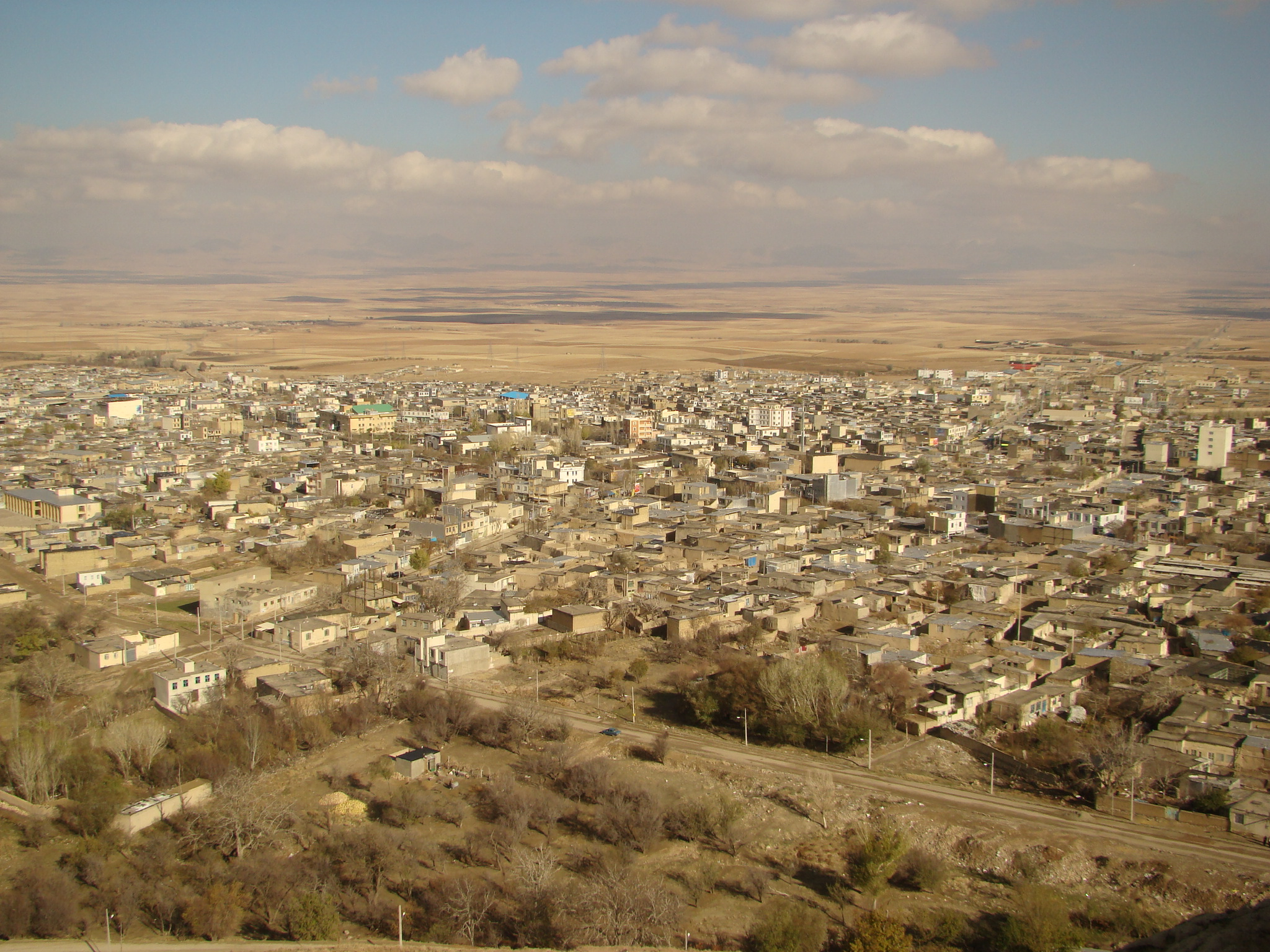
- Qeydar from above

- Location within Iran
- Coordinates: 36°07′10″N 48°35′30″E
- Country: Iran
- Province: Zanjan
- County: Khodabandeh
- District: Central

Population (2020)
  - Total: 51,320
- Time zone: UTC+3:30 (IRST)

Qeydar (Persian: قيدار) (Note: Also romanized as Qidar and Qīdar) is a city in the Central District of Khodabandeh County, Zanjan province, Iran, serving as capital of both the county and the district.

== Etymology ==
The city is named after the biblical figure Qedar, who was the progenitor of the Qedarite tribal confederation of North Arabia and the son of Ishmael. Qedar is revered in the Islamic traditions as an ancestor of the Islamic prophet Muhammad. The Shi'ite sect of Islam (which is predominant in Iran) believes that Qedar was a prophet.

Other names for the city stemming from the same source include Geydār, Geydār Palnamnār, Ghaidar, Ghaidar Paighambar, Kedar, Keydar, Keydar-Peygambar, and Qidār Peyghāmbar. (Note: Geydār Palnamnār, Ghaidar Paighambar, Keydar-Peygambar, and Qidār Peyghāmbar all mean "The Prophet Qedar")

== Climate ==
Climate data for Qeydar, Khodabandeh (altitude:1,887.0 m (6,190.9 ft), 1994-2010 normals)
Month	Jan	Feb	Mar	Apr	May	Jun	Jul	Aug	Sep	Oct	Nov	Dec	Year
Mean daily maximum °C (°F)	1.2 (34.2)	2.8 (37.0)	9.1 (48.4)	15.6 (60.1)	20.8 (69.4)	27.2 (81.0)	30.7 (87.3)	31.7 (89.1)	26.4 (79.5)	19.3 (66.7)	10.2 (50.4)	4.7 (40.5)	16.6 (62.0)
Daily mean °C (°F)	−2.9 (26.8)	−0.6 (30.9)	5.0 (41.0)	10.3 (50.5)	15.0 (59.0)	20.5 (68.9)	23.9 (75.0)	24.3 (75.7)	19.7 (67.5)	13.8 (56.8)	5.8 (42.4)	0.7 (33.3)	11.3 (52.3)
Mean daily minimum °C (°F)	−6.3 (20.7)	−5.2 (22.6)	−0.3 (31.5)	4.9 (40.8)	9.0 (48.2)	13.4 (56.1)	16.5 (61.7)	17.4 (63.3)	12.8 (55.0)	7.9 (46.2)	1.5 (34.7)	−2.8 (27.0)	5.7 (42.3)
Average precipitation mm (inches)	36.1 (1.42)	47.7 (1.88)	58.3 (2.30)	73.6 (2.90)	40.0 (1.57)	10.3 (0.41)	7.6 (0.30)	4.3 (0.17)	3.8 (0.15)	18.8 (0.74)	48.9 (1.93)	45.1 (1.78)	394.5 (15.55)
Average snowy days	9.1	8.7	6.0	1.2	0.1	0	0	0	0	0	2.4	7.3	34.8
Average relative humidity (%)	72	70	57	50	45	34	34	30	31	42	59	66	49
Average dew point °C (°F)	−6.4 (20.5)	−3.8 (25.2)	−2.1 (28.2)	2.0 (35.6)	5.2 (41.4)	7.4 (45.3)	9.7 (49.5)	8.9 (48.0)	4.7 (40.5)	3.0 (37.4)	−0.4 (31.3)	−3.7 (25.3)	2.0 (35.7)
Mean monthly sunshine hours	149.2	172.4	212.4	229.9	298.1	347.7	351.5	342.8	311.2	253.8	187.6	156.4	3,013
Source: IRIMO(temperatures), (precipitation), (humidity), (snow and sleet days), (sun)

== Demographics ==
=== Population ===
At the time of the 2006 National Census, the city's population was 25,525 in 6,253 households. The following census in 2011 counted 30,251 people in 7,997 households. The 2016 census measured the population of the city as 34,921 people in 10,028 households.

== Main sights ==
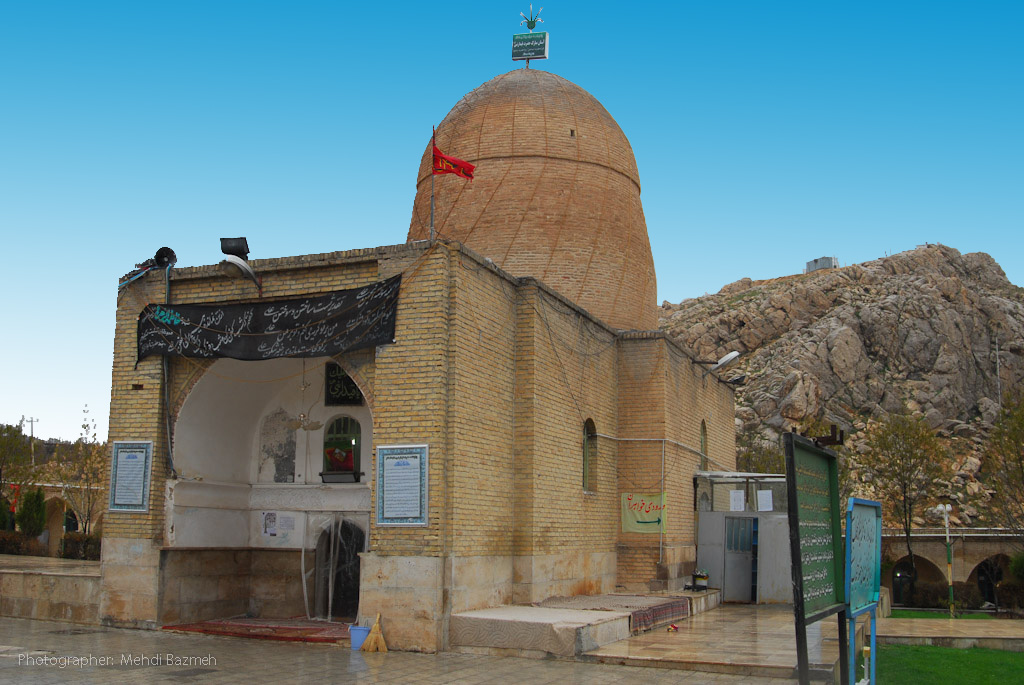
The mausoleum that is said to be the burial place of Qedar

The Mausoleum of the Prophet Qeydar is located in the city and is believed to entomb the remains of the city's namesake.

== See also ==
Media related to Qeydar at Wikimedia Commons
