= Tema (son of Ishmael) =

Tema was, according to the Bible, the ninth son of Ishmael.

The name Tema or Te'ma or Tema' (תֵּימָא or תֵּמָא) means the south. The name is rendered Greek: Θαιμάν and Thema in Latin,

The name also applied to the name of the tribe that were descended from him and the district they lived in.
