= Dumah (son of Ishmael) =

Biblical character

According to the Hebrew Bible, Dumah (Hebrew: דּוּמָה Dūmā, "silence"; Arabic: دومة) was the sixth son of Ishmael and grandson of Abraham and Hagar. He is listed among the twelve sons of Ishmael in Genesis 25:14 and 1 Chronicles 1:30, who are traditionally associated with the ancestors of twelve Ishmaelite tribal groups.

Some scholars identify Dumah with the ancient city of Duma in modern Saudi Arabia.

== Biblical references ==
The generations of Ishmael are the ninth recorded in the Book of Genesis. In Genesis 21:18, the angel of God promises Hagar and Abraham that their seed will forge a great nation and in Genesis 17:20, it is recorded that Ishmael produced 12 sons, the forefathers of 12 tribes. Dumah is the sixth son of Ishmael according to Genesis 25:14 and 1 Chronicles 1:30.

== The tribe of Dumah ==
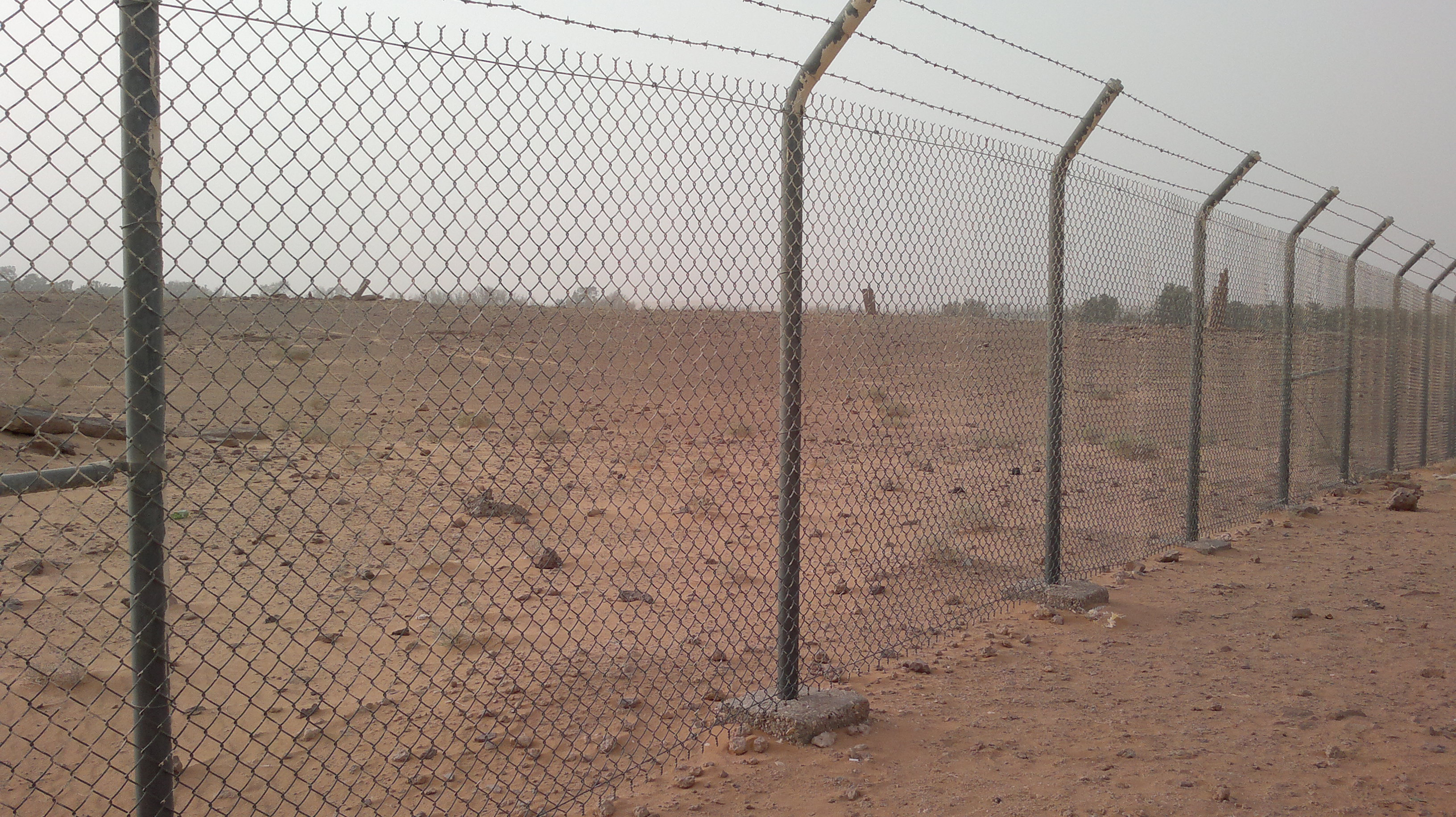
Ruins Near Dumah: it is common practice in Saudi Arabia to fence archaeological sites.

In the Book of Isaiah (Isaiah 21:11), Dumah is mentioned in the context of Seir, which was associated with the territory of Edom in the Negev region. Attempts to locate a tribe named for and descended from the Biblical Dumah have produced multiple possible identifications. A Dumah (Deir ad-Duma) in the vicinity of Hebron which is mentioned in Joshua 15:52 is one possibility. However, according to Geoffrey Bromiley, the oracle concerning Dumah in Isaiah 21:11-12 seems better suited to a place in Arabia, suggesting the site of Dumat al-Jandal as a more likely contender. Known today as Al-Jawf, in ancient times it is mentioned in inscriptions of the Assyrian monarchs as Adummatu and is described as "a fortress of Arabia", "situated in the desert", that was destroyed by Sennacherib's forces.

== Bibliography ==
- Bromiley, Geoffrey W. (1979), The International Standard Bible Encyclopedia (2nd, revised ed.), Wm. B. Eerdmans Publishing, ISBN 9780802837813
- Rosenmüller, Ernst Friedrich Carl; Morren, Nathaniel (1841), The Biblical Geography of Asia Minor, Phoenicia, and Arabia, Thomas Clark, ISBN 9780524051108
