= Tomb of Samuel, Iran =

Mausoleum of Prophet Samuel
- آرامگاه اشموئیل نبی
- Location of the mausoleum in Iran

Religion
- Affiliation: Shia Islam
- Ecclesiastical or organizational status: Mausoleum
- Status: Active

Location
- Location: Near Verdeh, Zarandieh County, Markazi Province
- Country: Iran
- Interactive map of Mausoleum of Prophet Samuel
- Coordinates: 35°13′47″N 50°10′53″E

Specifications
- Dome: 1
- Materials: Brick, stone

Iran National Heritage List
- Official name: Mausoleum of Prophet Samuel
- Type: Built
- Designated: 1975
- Reference no.: 1181
- Conservation organization: Cultural Heritage, Handicrafts and Tourism Organization of Iran

The Mausoleum of Prophet Samuel (Persian: آرامگاه اشموئیل نبی) is a Shi'ite mausoleum located in Zarandieh County, in the province of Zanjan, Iran. It is believed by locals to be the burial place of Samuel.

The mausoleum was added to the Iran National Heritage List in 1938 and is administered by the Cultural Heritage, Handicrafts and Tourism Organization of Iran. It is built to the direction of Jerusalem, like other Jewish shrines.

== See also ==
- List of burial places of Abrahamic figures
- List of Islamic prophets buried in Iran
- List of mausoleums in Iran
- Tomb of Samuel in the West Bank
