= Qedar (person) =

Ancestor of the Qedarites

Qēḏār ben Yīšmāʿēʾl
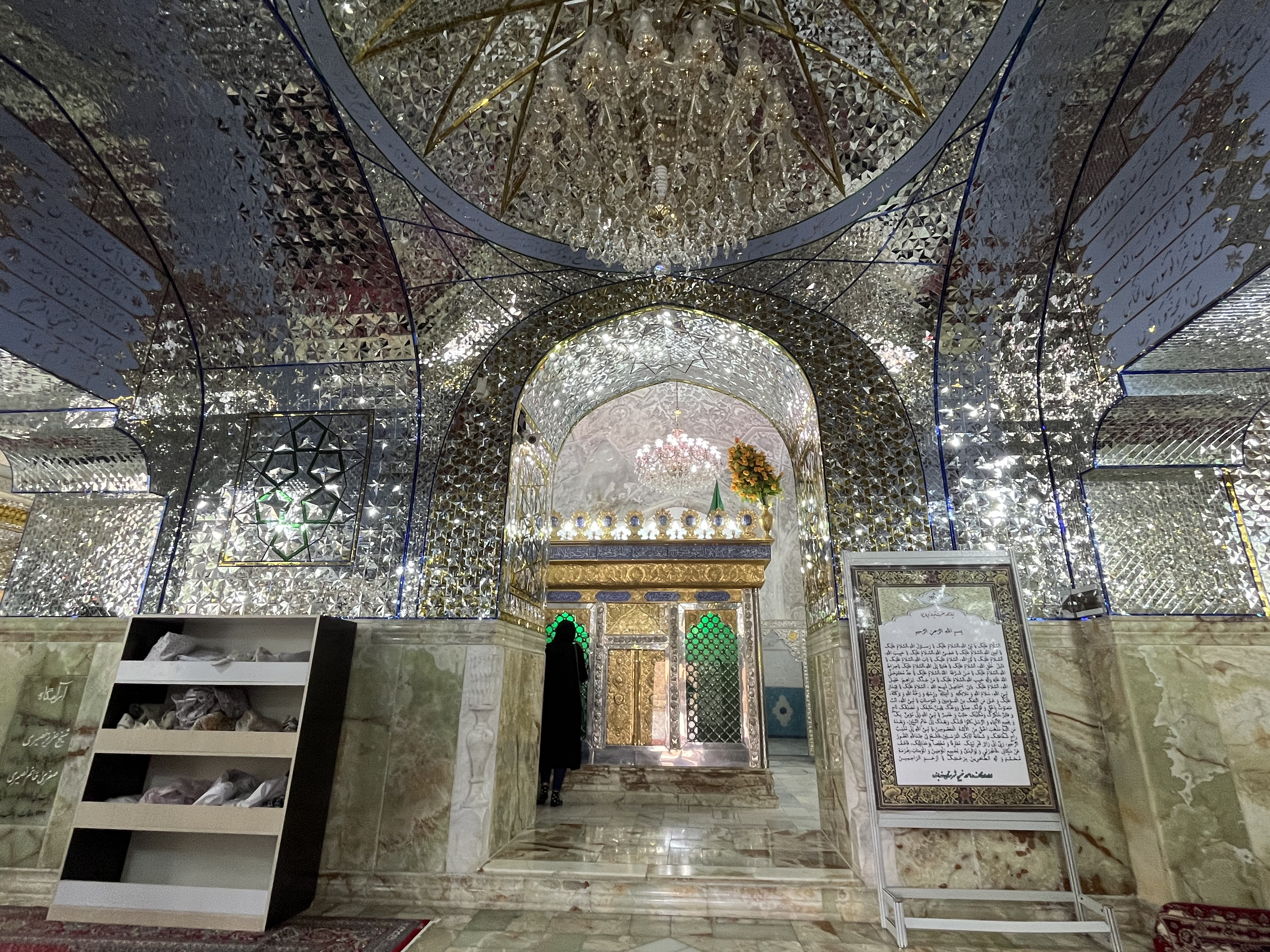
- Purported tomb of Qedar, located in the Zanjan Province of Iran
- Born: Arabian Peninsula
- Burial place: His tomb at Zanjan, Iran (according to Twelver Shi'a tradition); 36°06′59″N 48°35′08″E
- Other name: Kēdár
- Occupation: Custodian of the Kaaba (in Islamic tradition)
- Known for: Being the ancestor of the Qedarite tribal confederation
- Children: Qedarites
- Parent: Ishmael
- Relatives: Nebaioth (brother)

Qēḏār (Ancient North Arabian: 𐪄𐪕𐪇, romanized: qdr, Ancient Greek: Κηδάρ, romanized: Kēdár, Arabic: قيدار, romanized: qīdār, Hebrew: קֵדָר, romanized: qēḏār), also spelled Kēdár, was the eponymous ancestor of the Qedarite tribal confederation. He is mentioned in the Bible as being a son of Ishmael and is regarded as being the ancestor of the Islamic prophet Muhammad. The city of Qeydar in the Central District of Khodabandeh County in Iran is named after him.

== Biblical narrative ==
Qedar is mentioned in the Book of Genesis as being the second of Ishmael's twelve children, after Nebaioth. In the Books of Chronicles, Qedar is also named as the second son of Ishmael, with Nebaioth being the firstborn. The name "Kedar" is also later used by the Book of Isaiah, Book of Jeremiah and the Psalms as a name for a Middle Eastern tribal group, probably the Qedarites. (Note: Most English versions of the Bible refer to "Kedar".) Qedar's princely descendants are also described in the Book of Ezekiel as being merchants. In all, the name of Kedar is mentioned 11 times in the Old Testament.

== Arab traditions ==
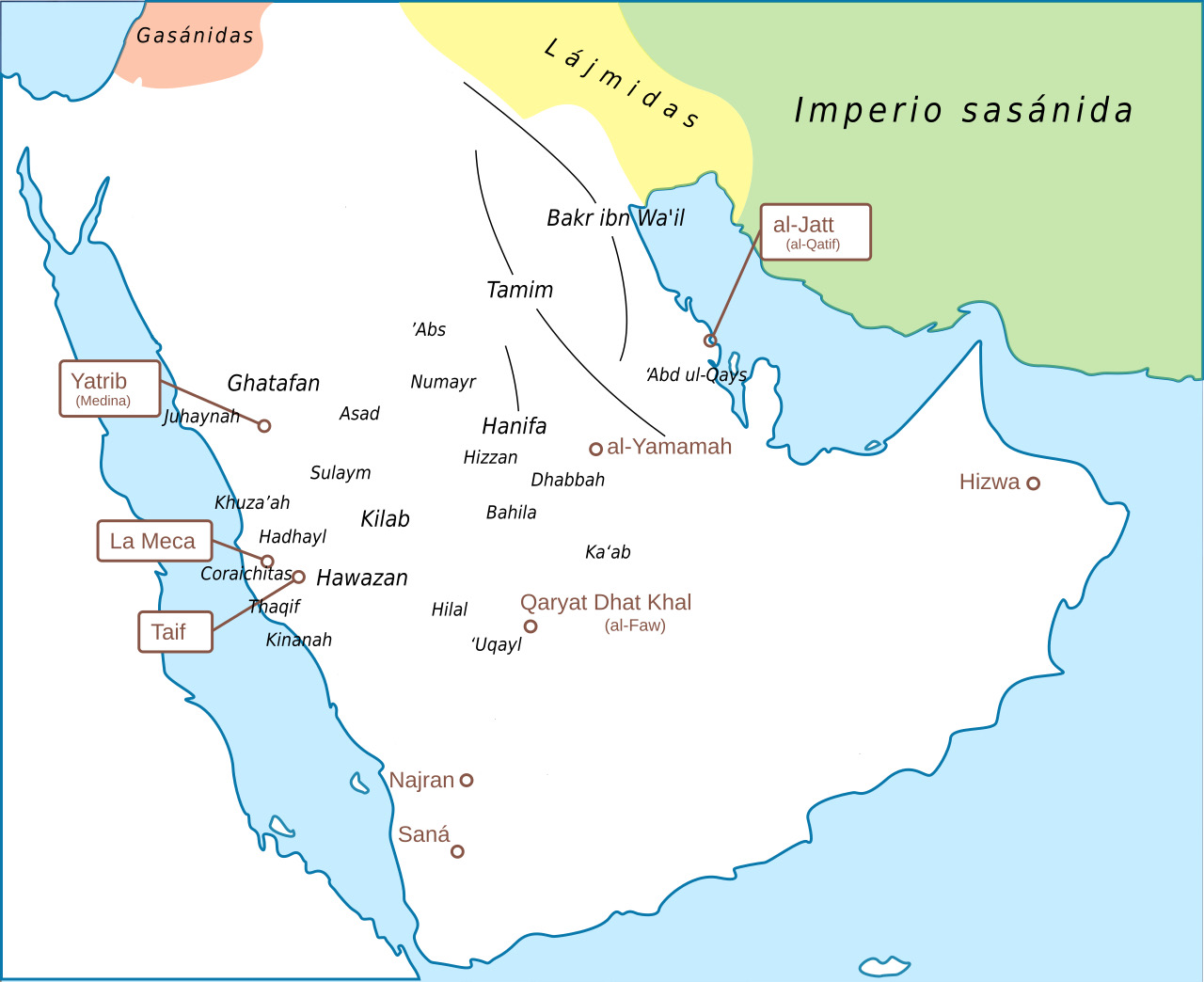
A map of the locations of the tribes believed to have been descended from Qedar in the pre-Islamic period just before the rise of Islam

Arab traditions relate that Qedar was the son of Ishmael and his wife, the daughter of the chief of the Jurhum tribe. Qedar and his brother Nebaioth also become the caretakers of the Kaaba in Mecca after the death of their father, before their maternal grandfather took over the role later on. Qedar is also said to have been the ancestor of Adnan, hence making him an ancestor of the Adnanite tribes and confederations including the Quda'a, Mudar, Hudhayl, Kinana, Taghlib, Bakr ibn Wa'il and Quraysh.

=== Islamic view ===
The Islamic view of Qedar affirms what is mentioned in the biblical and Arabian traditions. Additionally, Muslim historians cite Qedar as being the ancestor of the prophet Muhammad. Ibn Hisham, however, proposes a different lineage and believes that Muhammad is descended from Nebaioth (the firstborn son of Ishmael) and not Qedar.

== Sites associated with Qedar ==
=== Arabian Peninsula ===
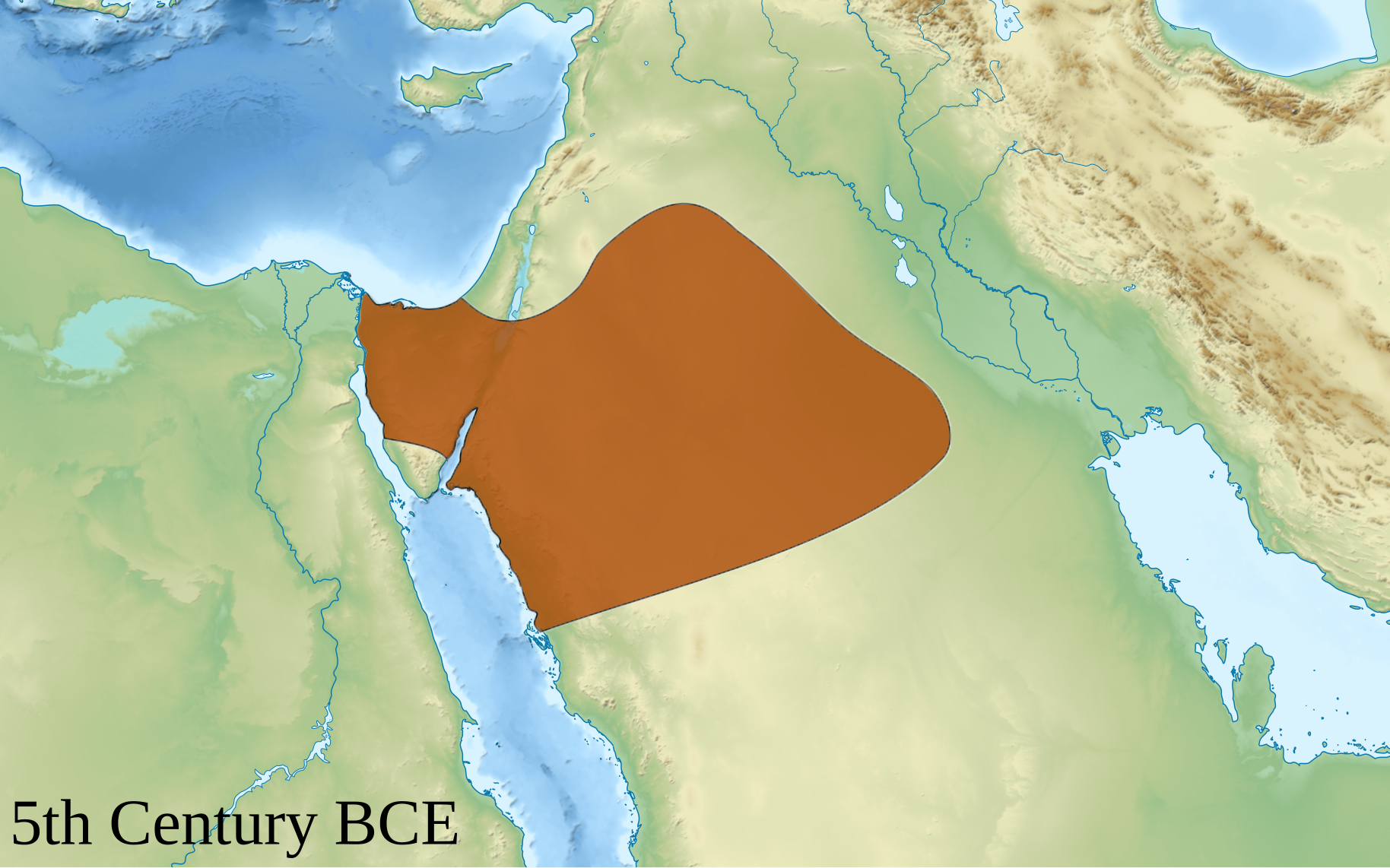
The kingdom of the Qedarites in the 5th century BCE, covering Wadi Sirhan, including the city of Dumat al-Jandal and parts of the North Arabian coast

The Qedarites ruled Wādī Sirḥān within Northern Arabia and are first attested to in the 9th century BCE. Their capital was the city of Dumat al-Jandal. Assyrian records sometimes regarded the Qedarites as being synonymous with all of the Arab people.

=== Iran ===
The city of Qeydar, named after Qedar, contains a tomb dedicated to him which was built in the 14th century during the Mongol Ilkhanate rule. The room where the tomb is situated is topped by a brick dome and the grave itself is covered by a wooden zarih. It is a national monument of Iran.

== See also ==
- Nebaioth
- Sheba (king)
- Family tree of Muhammad
