= List of tribes in pre-Islamic Arabia =

There were several pre-Islamic Arabian tribes.

Many of the most prominent tribes are ones salient to the life of Muhammad, such as the Quraish. The Quraish were divided into subclans, including Banu Hashim (Muhammad's clan), Banu Abd-Shams (sister, and among the biggest enemies of, Banu Hashim). Other tribes from included Banu Thaqif and the Banu Utub, and among the Jewish tribes in Medina, the Banu Qurayza, Banu Nadir and the Banu Qainuqa.

== The Great Skulls of Arabia ==
Historically, the most powerful pre-Islamic tribes in memory are considered to be the following:

- Bakr, with descendants in Arabia and Iraq.
- Kinanah, with descendants in Arabia, Iraq, Egypt, Sudan, Palestine, Tunisia, Morocco, and Syria and Yemen.
- Hawazin, with descendants in Arabia, Libya, Algeria, Morocco, Sudan, and Iraq.
- Tamim, with descendants in Arabia, Iraq, Iran, Palestine, Algeria, and Morocco
- Azd, with descendants in Arabia, Iraq, Levant, and North Africa.
- Ghatafan, with descendants in Arabia and the Maghreb.
- Madhhij, with descendants in Arabia, Syria and Iraq.
- Abd al-Qays, with descendants in Arabia.
- Al Qays, with descendants in Arabia, Syria and Iraq.
- Quda'a, with descendants in Arabia, Syria, and North Africa.

Map of the Arabian Peninsula in 600 AD, showing the various Arab tribes and their areas of settlement. The Lakhmids (yellow) formed an Arab monarchy as clients of the Sasanian Empire, while the Ghassanids (red) formed an Arab monarchy as clients of the Roman Empire A map published by the British academic Harold Dixon during World War I, showing the presence of the Arab tribes in West Asia, 1914

== Tribes in the time of Muhammad ==
- Quraish — prominent in the city of Mecca
- Banu Kinanah — the brothers of Quraish, and they are prominent in and mostly around Mecca
- Banu al-Akhdari (Branch of quraish), They were very influential in Saudi Arabia, Algeria, Palestine, Iraq, Libya and Yemen
- Banu Bakr ibn Abd Manat — the city of Yalamlam and around Yathrib and they are a branch of Banu Kinanah
- Banu Jadhimah — the city of Yalamlam and they are a branch of Banu Kinanah
- Banu Hothail — The Brothers of Khuzaimah, and their neighbors in Mecca
- Banu Thaqif — the city of Ta'if, Urwah ibn Mas'ud
- Banu Bariq — the city of Bareq
- Banu Utub — the city of Najd
- Banu Ghatafan — east of Yathrib and Khaibar
- Banu Hilal -Hejaz and Najd
- Banu Tamim — Dominant force in Central Arabia
- Banu Sa'ad
- Banu Amr — Umar and his companions stayed with them during the hijrah from Mecca
- Banu Daws — south of Mecca Abu Hurairah
- Banu Abs — Hudhayfah ibn al-Yaman
- Banu Jumah
- Banu Kalb
- Abd al-Qays
- Banu Khuza'a — between Mecca and Badr
- Banu Hanifa — they are a branch of Banu Bakr
- Banu Lakhm

In Yathrib (later Medina)

- Banu Kinanah
- Banu Khazraj

== Jewish tribes ==
- Banu Alfageer
- Banu Alkahinan — they traced their descent from Aaron
- Banu Awf
- Banu Harith or Bnei Chorath were rulers of Najran.
- Banu Nadir — sub-clan of the al-Kāhinān, located in Yathrib (Medina)
- Banu Najjar
- Banu Qainuqa — most powerful of all the Jewish tribes of the peninsula before Islam
- Banu Quda'a — Himyarite tribe of converts to Sadducee Judaism
- Banu Qurayza — sub-clan of the al-Kāhinān, located in Yathrib (Medina), "principal family" fled Syria under Ghassanid rule, then fled Medina, after expulsion by Muhammed, back to Syria
- Banu Shutayba

== See also ==
- Non-Muslim interactants with Muslims during Muhammad's era
- Tribes of Arabia
