= History of the Jews in Saudi Arabia =

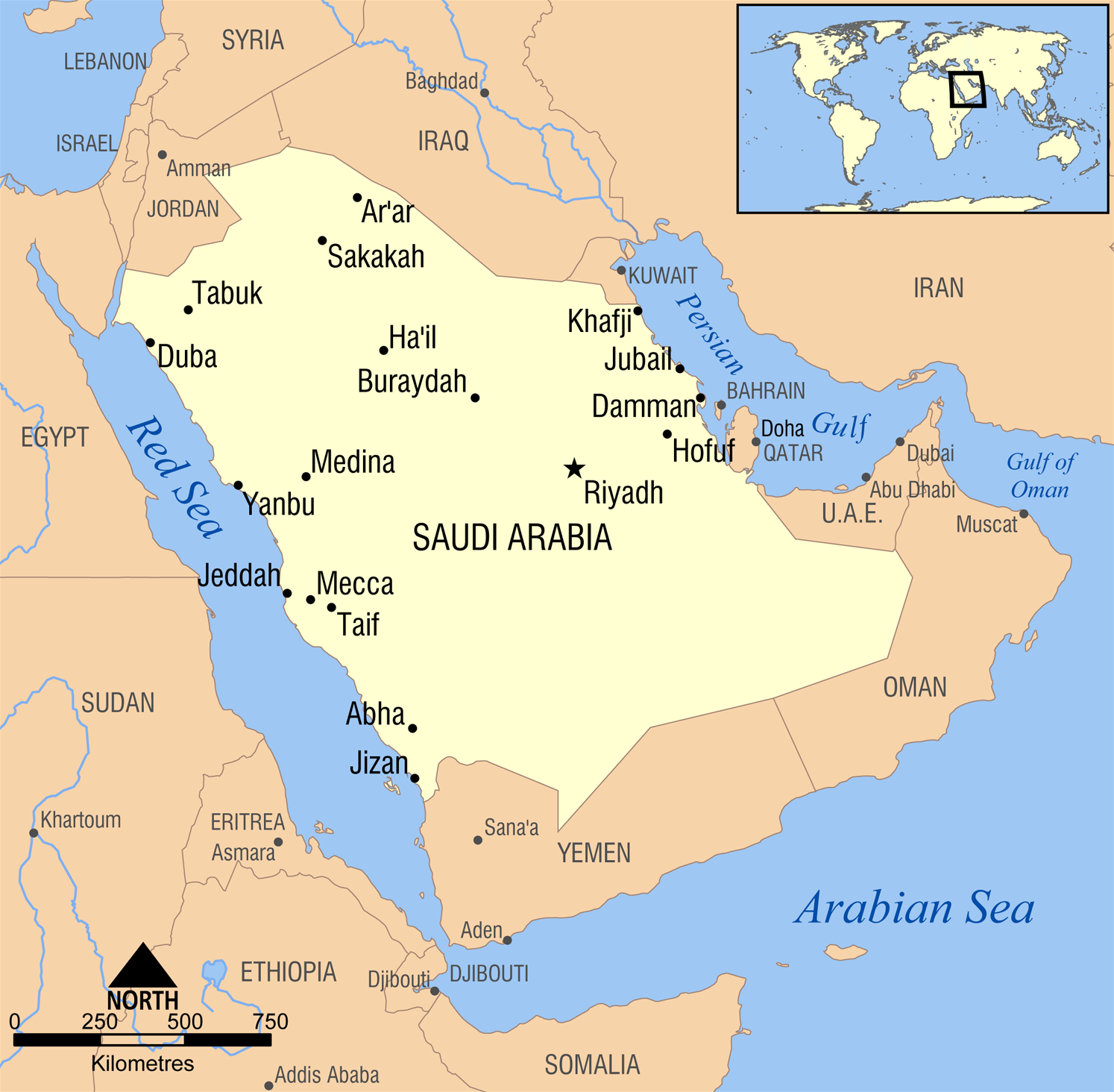
Map of the territory and area covered by present-day Saudi Arabia.

The history of the Jews in Saudi Arabia begins in classical antiquity.

== Jews and Judaism in pre-Islamic Arabia ==
By the 6th and 7th centuries there was a considerable Jewish population in Hejaz (largely around Medina) and in Yemen due to the embrace of Judaism by the Himyarite Kingdom in the fourth century. Jewish leadership in Yemen ended soon after Dhu Nuwas instigated a massacre of the Christian community of Najran.

According to Al-Masudi the northern part of Hejaz was a dependency of the Kingdom of Judah, and according to Butrus al-Bustani the Judahites in Hejaz established a sovereign state. The German orientalist Ferdinand Wüstenfeld believed that the Judahites established a state in northern Hejaz.

=== Tribes of Medina ===
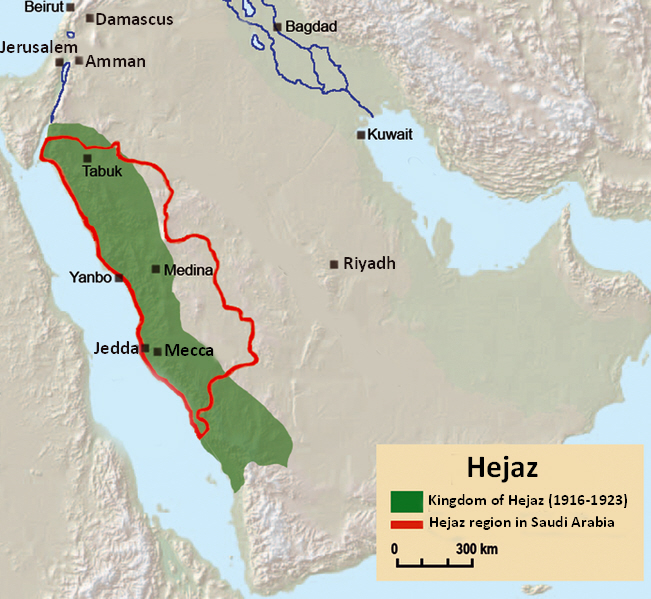
Map showing the region of Hejaz outlined in red

There were three main Jewish tribes in Medina before the rise of Islam in Arabia: the Banu Nadir, the Banu Qainuqa, and the Banu Qurayza.

The Banu Nadir were hostile to Muhammad's new religion. They joined the Meccan army against the Islamic army and were defeated.

Other Jewish tribes lived relatively peacefully under Muslim rule: Banu Nadir, the Banu Qainuqa, and the Banu Qurayza lived in northern Arabia, at the oasis of Yathrib until the 7th century. The men were executed and the women and children were enslaved after they betrayed the pact they made with the Muslims following the Invasion of Banu Qurayza by Muslim armies led by Muhammad.

=== Other tribes ===
- Banu Alfageer
- Banu Awf
- Banu Harith or Bnei Chorath
- Banu Jusham
- Banu Quda'a
- Banu Shutayba

== The journey of Benjamin of Tudela ==
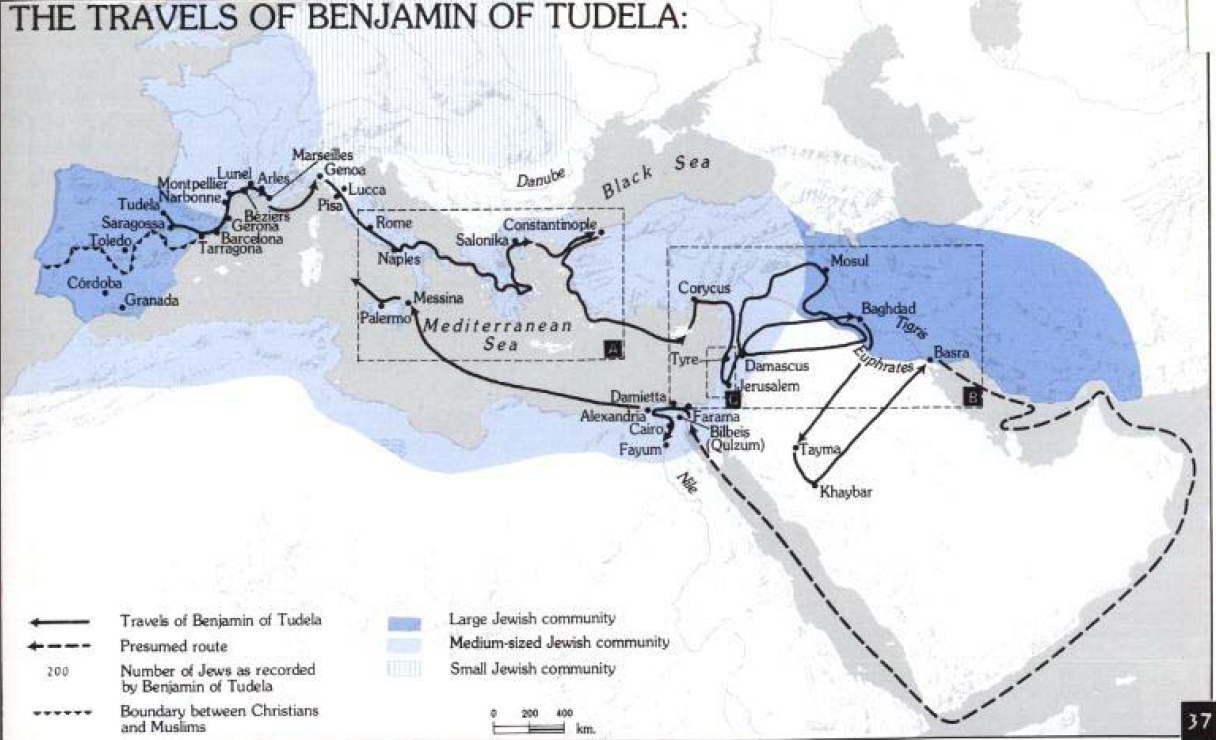
Map of the route.

A historical journey to visit far-flung Jewish communities was undertaken by Rabbi Benjamin of Tudela from 1165 to 1173 that crossed and tracked some of the areas that are located in present-day Saudi Arabia. One map of his travels shows that he stopped at Jewish communities living in Tayma and Khaybar two places that are known to have a longer significant historic Jewish presence in them, the Battle of Khaybar was fought between Muhammad and his followers against the centuries-long established Jewish community of Khaybar in 629. Tudela's trek began as a pilgrimage to the Holy Land. He may have hoped to settle there, but there is controversy about the reasons for his travels. It has been suggested he may have had a commercial motive as well as a religious one. On the other hand, he may have intended to catalogue the Jewish communities on the route to the Holy Land so as to provide a guide to where hospitality may have been found for Jews travelling to the Holy Land. He took the "long road" stopping frequently, meeting people, visiting places, describing occupations and giving a demographic count of Jews in every town and country.

One of the known towns that Benjamin of Tudela reported as having a Jewish community was "El Katif" located in the area of the modern-day city of Hofuf in the northern part of the Arabian Peninsula. Al-Hofuf also Hofuf or Al-Hufuf (Arabic: الهفوف) is the major urban center in the huge al-Ahsa Oasis in Eastern Province, Saudi Arabia. The city has a population of 287,841 (2004 census) and is part of a larger populated oasis area of towns and villages of around 600,000. It is located inland, southwest of Abqaiq and the Dhahran-Dammam-Al-Khobar metropolitan area on the road south to Haradh.

== Najran community ==
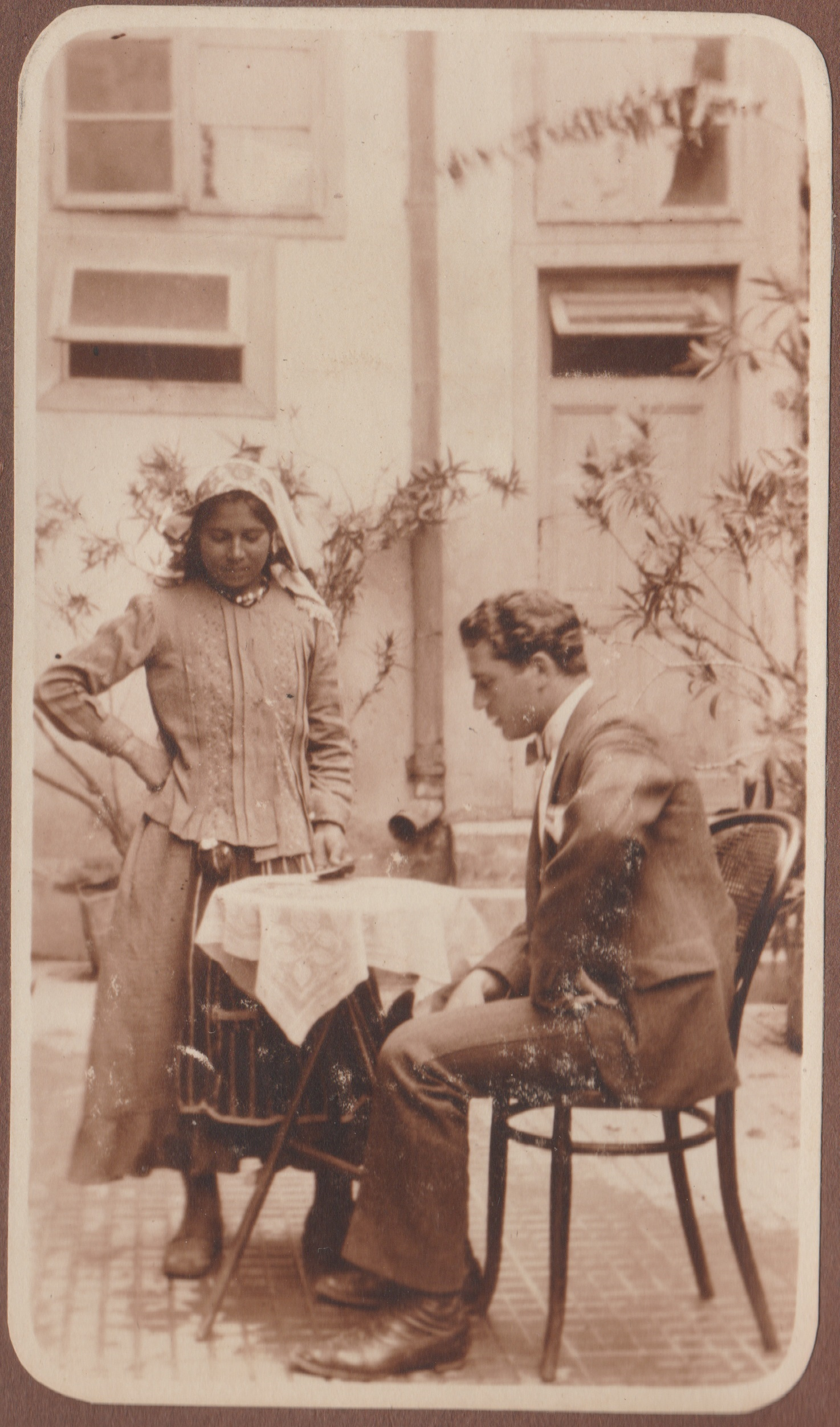
Rabbi Salomon Halevi (Last Rabbi of Madras Synagogue) and his wife Rebecca Cohen (Najran Jew), Paradesi Jews of Madras

There was a small Jewish community, mostly members of Bnei Chorath, in one border city from 1934 until 1950. The city of Najran was liberated by Saudi forces in 1934 after it been conquered by Yemenis in 1933, thus absorbing its Jewish community, which dates to pre-Islamic times. With increased persecution, the Jews of Najran made plans to evacuate. The local governor at the time, Amir Turki ben Mahdi, allowed the 600 Najrani Jews a single day on which to either evacuate or never leave again. Saudi soldiers accompanied them to the Yemeni border. These Jews arrived in Saada, and some 200 continued south to Aden between September and October 1949. The Saudi King Abdulaziz demanded their return, but the Yemeni king, Ahmad bin Yahya refused, because these refugees were Yemenite Jews. After settling in the Hashid Camp (also called Mahane Geula) they were airlifted to Israel as part of the larger Operation Magic Carpet.

According to Yemenite Jewish tradition, the Jews of Najran traced their origin to the Ten Tribes.

The local ruler at the time, Emir Turki bin Madi, granted them the choice between complete evacuation or permanent stay. Saudi forces accompanied them to ensure their safe passage until they reached Saada. King Abdulaziz Al Saud later requested their return, but the Yemeni Imam, Ahmed bin Yahya, refused, claiming they were Yemeni Jews. After staying in the Hashid camp, they were eventually airlifted to Israel as part of the "Magic Carpet" operation. At the end of King Faisal's rule, there were no Jews left in the region.

== Modern era ==
There has been virtually no Jewish activity in Saudi Arabia since the beginning of the 21st century. Jewish religious services are prohibited from being held in Saudi Arabia. When American military personnel were stationed in Saudi Arabia during the Gulf War, permission for small Christian worship services was eventually granted, but Jewish services were only permitted on US warships. Census data does not identify any Jews as residing within Saudi Arabian territory.

Historically, persons with an Israeli stamp in their passport or who are openly religious (and not Islamic) were generally not permitted to enter the Kingdom. In the 1970s, foreigners wishing to work in the kingdom had to sign an affidavit stating that they were not Jewish and official government forms granting foreigners permission to enter or exit the country do ask for religious affiliation.

During the Gulf War, there were allegations that some United States military authorities were encouraging Jewish military personnel to avoid listing their religions on their ID tags. (It has been reported that Jewish personnel, along with others, were encouraged to "use discretion" when practicing their religion while deployed to Saudi Arabia). American servicemen and women who were Jewish were allowed into the kingdom, but religious services had to be held discreetly on base. It has been affirmed that alternative "Protestant B" dog tags were created, in the event that a Jewish serviceman or woman was taken prisoner in Iraq. The story was included in one civilian writer's anthology of military stories she had been told by others, and then that one story was reprinted or quoted in many other in-print or online locations including Hadassah Magazine). It has been the subject of much debate as to its veracity, with some military personnel stating that the story is "absolutely false."

In late December 2014, the newspaper Al-Watan reported that the Saudi Labor ministry website permits foreign workers of a variety of different faiths, including Judaism, to live and work in Saudi Arabia. A source within the ministry said, in effect, that Israelis were not allowed to enter Saudi Arabia, but Jews of other nationalities would not have the entry ban applied to them. In practice Christians and Jews may hold religious services but only in their homes and may not invite Muslims. However, as of May 2022, Israeli media outlets reported that dozens of Israelis were able to enter Saudi Arabia with Israeli passports using special visas. According to some Jewish expatriates living in the Kingdom, there are around 3,000 Jews who currently reside in Saudi Arabia, mostly from the US, Canada, France, and South Africa.

After the Abraham Accords, Saudi Arabia outlawed the disparagement of Jews and Christians in mosques, and also removed anti-semitic passages from school textbooks. In a notable departure from past practices, Saudi Arabia has recently hosted and participated in multifaith conferences that have included Jewish representatives. In May 2022, the Kingdom backed a forum titled “Common Values Among the Followers of Religions,” organized by the Muslim World League in Riyadh, which convened Muslim clerics alongside Jewish rabbis, Christian priests, and leaders from Hindu, Buddhist, and other faiths.

On 3 October 2023, Israeli Communications Minister Shlomo Karhi participated in a Jewish morning prayer service in Riyadh on the Sukkot holiday that included a Torah scroll dedicated to "King Salman bin Abdulaziz, Crown Prince Mohamed bin Salman and all their ministers and advisers." Karhi's visit was part of an effort by Israel and Saudi Arabia to normalize their diplomatic relations.

== See also ==
- Israel–Saudi Arabia relations
- History of the Jews in the Arabian Peninsula
- Saudi Arabia textbook controversy
- Arab Jews
- Babylonian captivity
- History of the Jews under Muslim rule
- Jewish exodus from Arab lands
- Judaism and Islam
- List of Jews from the Arab World
- Mizrahi Jews
