= Jewish tribes of Arabia =

Residents of Arabia before and during Muhammad's era

The earliest attested presence of Jews in the Arabian Peninsula dates back to the early 6th century BCE, following the Babylonian conquest of Judah, which resulted in their expulsion from the Land of Israel. Over time and through successive exiles, the local Jewish tribes, who were concentrated in the Hejaz and partly in South Arabia, established themselves as one of the most prominent ethno-religious communities of pre-Islamic Arabia. Likewise, Judaism, which had been introduced as one of the few monotheistic religions in the region, stood as a deviation from the typical polytheistic practices of Arab paganism. These Jewish tribes continued to have a presence in Arabia during the rise of Muhammad, who founded Islam in the early 7th century CE. Muhammad's interaction with the Jewish community is documented to a considerable degree in Islamic literature, including in many ahadith. The Jewish tribes of the Hejaz are seen in Islam as having been the descendants of the Israelites/Hebrews. Two of Muhammad's wives were Jewish: Safiyya bint Huyayy and Rayhanah bint Zayd, both of whom belonged to the Banu Nadir by birth, though Rayhanah's status as a wife is disputed.

== List of tribes and clans ==
Some of the Jewish tribes of Arabia historically attested include:

- Banu Harith or Bnei Chorath
- Banu Qaynuqa
- Banu Shutayba
- Jafna Clan of the Banu Tha'labah, who were exiled members of the Banu Ghassan: while neither tribe was Jewish, they did have Jewish members. The Jafna Clan was solely Jewish.
- Banu Zaura
- Banu Zurayq In Islamic lore, Labid ben Asam was a Jewish sorcerer who cast a spell on Muhammad that made him ill for several months and prevented him from having sexual relations with his wives
- Banu Qurayza — sub-clan of the al-Kāhinān, located in Yathrib (Medina)
- Banu Nadir — sub-clan of the al-Kāhinān, located in Yathrib (Medina)
- Banu Najjar - Charter of Medina
- Banu Juw — sub-clan of the Banu Qaynuqa.
- Banu Awf
- Banu Alfageer

== History of Jewish immigration to Arabia ==
Judaism found its place in the Arabian Peninsula by immigration of Jews, which took place mainly during six periods:

- After the collapse of the Kingdom of Judah in 587 BCE.
- After the Roman conquest of Judea.
- After the Jewish rebellion in 66 CE, and the destruction of Jerusalem by Titus in 70 CE, exiles found a home in the desert.
- Survivors of the Bar Kochba Revolt, in 135 CE, who sought religious freedom in the Arabian desert rather than live under the yoke of the Romans.
- Immigration, around 300 CE, by people who are known in Islamic literature as the Banu Aus and the Banu Khazraj who fled the Ghassanids in Syria.
- Migration from Judea into the southern Arabian Peninsula to ride the ascent of the Himyarite Kingdom around 380 CE.

=== South Arabia (Yemen) ===
The Sanaite Jews have a tradition that their ancestors settled in Yemen forty-two years before the destruction of the First Temple. One tradition, shared with northern Yemenite Jews, states that under the prophet Jeremiah some 75,000 Jews, including priests and Levites, traveled to Yemen. The Banu Habban in southern Yemen have a tradition that they are the descendants of Judeans who settled in the area before the destruction of the Second Temple. These Judeans supposedly belonged to a brigade dispatched by King Herod to assist the Roman legions fighting in the region.

==== Judaized Arabs and the Himyarite Kingdom ====
In about 400 CE, Himyarite King tubba Abu Karib As'ad Kamil (385-420 CE), a convert to Judaism, led military expeditions into central Arabia and expanded his empire to encompass most of the Arabian Peninsula. His army had marched north to battle the Aksumites who had been fighting for control of Yemen for a hundred years. The Aksumites were only expelled from the region when the newly-Jewish king rallied Jews together from all over Arabia with pagan allies. The relationship between the Himyarite Kings and the polytheistic Arab tribes strengthened when, under the royal permission of Tubba' Abu Karib As'ad, Qusai ibn Kilab (400–480 CE) reconstructed the Ka'aba from a state of decay, and had the Arab al-Kahinan (Cohanim) build their houses around it. Qusai ibn Kilab was the great-great- grandfather of Shaiba ibn Hashim (Abdul-Mutallib). Shaiba ibn Hashim was fifth in the line of descent to Muhammad, and attained supreme power at Mecca. Qusai ibn Kilab is among the ancestors of Sahaba and the progenitor of the Banu Quraish. When Qusai came of age, a man from the tribe of Banu Khuza'a named Hulail (Hillel) was the trustee of the Kaaba, and the Na'sa (Nasi)—authorized to calculate the calendar. Qusai married his daughter and, according to Hulail's will, obtained Hulail's rights to the Ka'aba. Hulail, according to Arabian tradition was a member of the Banu Jurhum. Banu Jurhum was a sub-group of the Banu Qahtani from whom the Himyarites originally descend.

Around 455 CE, the last Himyarite King is born, Zur'ah Yusuf Ibn Tuban As'ad Abu Kaleb Dhu Nuwas or Dhu Nuwas. He died in 510. His zeal for Judaism brought about his fall. Having heard of the persecutions of Jews by Byzantine emperors, Dhu Nuwas retaliated by putting to death some Byzantine merchants who were traveling on business through Himyara. He didn't simply kill them with hanging—he burned them in large pits—earning him the title "King of the burning pit".

These killings destroyed the trade of Yemen with Europe and involved Dhu Nuwas in a war with the heathen King Aidug, whose commercial interests were injured by these killings. Dhu Nuwas was defeated, then he made war against the Christian city Najran in Yemen, which was a dependency of his kingdom. After its surrender, he offered the citizens the alternative of embracing Judaism, under coercion, or being put to death. As they refused to renounce their faith, he executed their chief, Harith ibn Kaleb, and three hundred and forty chosen men.

== Rise of Islam ==
The Jewish tribes played a significant role during the rise of Islam. Muhammad had many contacts with Jewish tribes, both urban and nomadic. The eating of pork has always been strongly prohibited in both religions.

In the Constitution of Medina, Jews were given equality to Muslims in exchange for political loyalty and were allowed to practice their own culture and religion. A significant narrative symbolising the inter-faith harmony between early Muslims and Jews is that of the Rabbi Mukhayriq. The Rabbi was from Banu Nadir and fought alongside Muslims at the Battle of Uhud and bequeathed his entire wealth to Muhammad in the case of his death. He was subsequently called "the best of the Jews" by Muhammad. Later, as Muhammad encountered opposition from the Jews, Muslims began to adopt a more negative view on the Jews, seeing them as something of a fifth column. Early Muslim conquests resulted in the exile of the Banu Qainuqa and Banu Nadir, two of the main three Jewish tribes from Medina, and the mass execution of all male adults of the Banu Qurayza clan.

Some historians, like Guillaume, see the attacks on the Banu Qaynuqa for their hostility against the Muslims and for mocking them. They left for modern-day Der'a in Syria. In one account, the Banu Nadir tribe was evicted from Medina after they attempted to assassinate Muhammad.

== See also ==
- Jewish diaspora
  - History of the Jews in the Arabian Peninsula
  - Judaism in pre-Islamic Arabia
- Islamic–Jewish relations
  - Jewish views on Muhammad
- Gerim

== Bibliography ==
- Firestone, Reuven (4 January 2016). "Muslim-Jewish Relations". Oxford Research Encyclopedia of Religion. Oxford: Oxford University Press. doi:10.1093/acrefore/9780199340378.013.17. ISBN 978-0-19-934037-8. S2CID 163063592. Archived from the original on 3 December 2018.
- Waardenburg, Jean Jacques (2003). "The Earliest Relations of Islam with Other Religions: The Jews in Medina". Muslims and Others: Relations in Context. Religion and Reason. Vol. 41. Berlin: De Gruyter. pp. 91–109. doi:10.1515/9783110200959. ISBN 978-3-11-017627-8.
