= Abu Ghabshan =

Custodian of the Ka'aba during pre-Islamic times

In the Islamic tradition, Abū Ghubshān (Arabic: أبو غبشان, real name Sulaym ibn 'Amr) was the final Khuza'ite custodian of the Ka'aba during the pre-Islamic period of Mecca.

== Biography ==
Abu Ghubshan was a member of the Banu Khuza'ah, an Arab tribe that held control of the Ka'aba after the expulsion of the Jurhum, an earlier tribe that became among the ʿArab bāʾida ("extinct Arabs"). Custodians of the Ka'aba were appointed from the dominant Banu Khuza'ah by the people of Mecca as a form of gratitude after they helped to overthrow the Jurhum, who had been unfairly taxing pilgrims to the sanctuary as well as mistreating locals. However, the Khuza'ites themselves began to become oppressive and their morals deteriorated, much like the majority of the other Arab tribes in pre-Islamic Mecca, who became inclined to polytheism, gambling, debt slavery and excessive drinking.

The Qurayshi historian and former qāḍī, Al-Zubayr ibn Bakkar, narrates that Abu Ghubshan met with Qusayy ibn Kilab, the patriarch of the Quraysh, when the former was intoxicated after drinking alcohol. Qusayy asked Abu Ghubshan for a price of the keys of the Ka'aba, to which the latter, in a drunken stupor, replied that he could give Qusayy the keys in exchange for a packet of wine. So, Qusayy bought a packet of wine and gave it to Abu Ghubshan, who kept his word and gave him the keys to the Ka'aba. Once he was certain that Abu Ghubshan had been satisfied with the deal, Qusayy announced publicly that the descendants of Ishmael (i.e. Quraysh) had regained control of the Ka'aba.

When Abu Ghubshan had gotten back to his senses, he tried to take the keys of the Ka'aba back, forgetting that he had sold them when he was drunk. The Banu Khuza'ah tried to use military force to reclaim custodianship of the Ka'aba, but were defeated by the forces of the Quraysh which had anticipated such an event. Most of the Khuza'ites were expelled from Mecca afterwards.

== In Arabic literature ==
Ibn al-Jawzi records three popular Arabic sayings, "More regretful than Abu Ghubshan," "a bigger loser than Abu Ghubshan" or "surpassing Abu Ghubshan's foolishness" all of which are made in reference to the fact that Abu Ghubshan sold the keys of the Ka'aba at such a cheap price when drunk and foolishly tried to take the keys back when he had returned to a sober state. A poem about the affair has been transmitted from the same source:

Khuza'ah sold Allah's house while drunk;
for a sack of wine, what a wretched transaction!
It sold its guardianship for wine, and went off;
from the standing place, the caller and its house were lost!

== See also ==
- Qusayy ibn Kilab
- Custodian of the Ka'aba
