= Abu Dharr al-Ghifari =

Companion of Muhammad (died 652)

Abu Dharr أَبُو ذَرّ

Personal life
- Born: Jundab ibn Junādah (جُنْدَب ٱبْن جُنَادَة) Hejaz, Arabia
- Died: 31 Hijri, Dhul Qadah / 652 CE Al-Rabadha, Rashidun Caliphate
- Resting place: Al-Rabadha, Hejaz (present day Saudi Arabia)
- Children: Dharr (daughter)
- Parents: Junādah (father); Ramlah (mother)
- Known for: companion of Muhammad
- Relatives: Unais (Brother)

Religious life
- Religion: Islam

Abu Dharr Al-Ghifari Al-Kinani (أَبُو ذَرّ ٱلْغِفَارِيّ ٱلْكِنَانِيّ, ʾAbū Ḏarr al-Ghifārīy al-Kinānīy), also spelled Abu Tharr or Abu Zar, born Jundab ibn Junādah (جُنْدَب ٱبْن جُنَادَة), was the fourth or fifth person converting to Islam, and a member of the Muhajirun. He belonged to the Banu Ghifar, the Kinanah tribe. His date of birth is unknown. He died in 652 CE, at Al-Rabadha, in the desert east of Medina.

Abu Dharr is remembered for his strict piety and also his opposition to Muawiyah during the caliphate of Uthman ibn Affan. He is venerated by Shia Muslims as one of The Four Companions, early Muslims who were followers (Shia) of Ali ibn Abi Talib.

He was regarded by many, including Ali Shariati, Muhammad Sharqawi and Sami Ayad Hanna, as a principal antecedent of Islamic socialism, or the first Islamic socialist. He protested against the accumulation of wealth by the ruling class during 'Uthmān's caliphate and urged the equitable redistribution of wealth.

== Early life ==
Little is known of his life before his conversion to Islam. Abu Dharr is said to have been a serious young man, an ascetic and a monotheist even before he converted. According to a hadith, he was known to have prayed as early as the year 608, and to have been the first person to use the greeting As-salamu alaykum. He was born to the Ghifar clan, located to the south-west of Medina. Abu Dharr was apparently typical of the early converts to Islam, described by Ibn Shihab al-Zuhri as "young men and weak people." They were a part of the Ghifar clan of the Banu Bakr ibn Abd Manat tribe, part of the Kinana tribes, which also included the Quraysh tribe of Muhammad.

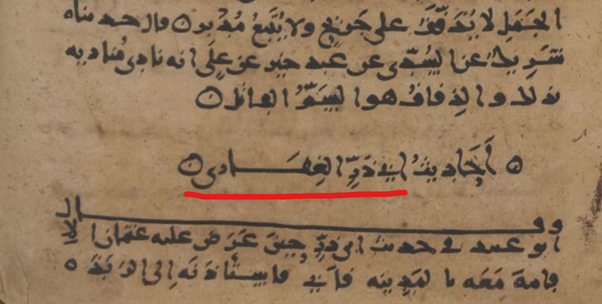
Name of Abu Dharr Al-Ghifari highlighted in red. From the hadith manuscript MS. Leiden Or. 298, dated 866 CE.

Popular accounts of Abu Dharr reported that his tribe lived by pillaging caravans, but that he preferred to live a poor but honest life as a shepherd. Having heard the contention that a new prophet had arisen in Mecca, Abu Dharr and his brother travelled to Mecca to find him. He converted instantly and rushed out to declare his new faith in front of the Kaaba, which at that time was a pagan temple. He was beaten for his religious beliefs. He did this three days in a row, after which the Islamic prophet Muhammad told him to return to his clan, where he taught his people about Islam. He and his tribe then joined Muhammad after the Hijra, or migration to Medina in 622 CE.

Muhammad once said that "the sky did not spread its canopy on any man who was more truthful than Abu Dharr."

This seems to be a simplified account of stories reported in these hadiths, 31:6049, 31:6048 and 31:6046.

According to the early Islamic historian Muhammad ibn Jarir al-Tabari, Abu Dharr claimed to have been the fourth or fifth convert to Islam. However, Saad bin Abi Waqqas made the same claim. While the exact order of conversion may never be established, there is no doubt that he was a very early convert.

== Military campaigns during Muhammad's era ==
During the expedition led by Ka'b ibn 'Umair al-Ghifari, his son Umair al-Ghifari was killed. In this expedition Muhammad ordered an attack on the Banu Quda'a tribe because Muhammad received intelligence that they had gathered a large number of men to attack the Muslim positions.

In response Muhammad ordered the third expedition led by Dhu Qarad to take revenge for the killing of the son of Abu Dharr Ghifari at al-Ghaba.

== After Muhammad's death ==
Abu Dharr had begun his agitation in Medina after Uthman had given 500,000 dirhams to Marwan I, 300,000 to al-Harith ibn al-Hakam, and 100,000 to the Medinan Zayd ibn Thabit from the khums of the booty seized in Ifriqiya in 647 CE. He then quoted relevant Qur'anic passages threatening the hoarders of riches with hell-fire. Marwan complained to Uthman who sent his servant Natil to warn Abu Dharr, but to no avail. Uthman displayed patience for some time until, in the presence of the caliph, Abu Dharr launched an angry verbal attack on Ka'ab al-Ahbar, who had backed Uthman's use of public money. Uthman now chided Abu Dharr and sent him to Damascus.

There is a Shia tradition that Muhammad predicted this sad end during the Battle of Tabouk, when Abu Dharr was left behind because his camel was ill or too weak. So he alighted from the camel and, placing the pack on his back, walked to join the rest of the army. Muhammad saw him and exclaimed:

Abu Dharr, may Allah have mercy upon you! You'll live alone, die alone and enter Paradise alone.

== Death ==
=== Sunni view ===
During the caliphate of Uthman, he stayed in Damascus and witnessed Muslims deviating from Islam, going after worldly pleasures and desires.

He was saddened and repelled by this. So Uthman invited him to come to Madinah where he was also disturbed by people's pursuit of worldly goods and pleasures.

Abu Dharr's Tomb in the East Medina, al-Rabathah.

Abu Dharr then asked Uthman for permission to live in al-Rabathah, a small village in eastern Madinah. Uthman approved his request. Abu Dharr stayed there away from people, holding to the traditions (sunnah) of Muhammad and his companions.

A relevant story about him is:

A man visited him once and when he found his house almost bare, he asked Abu Dharr: "Where are your possessions?"

Abu Dharr said: "We have a house yonder (meaning the hereafter), to which we send the best of our possessions."

The man understood what Abu Dharr meant and replied: "But you must have some possessions so long as you are in this abode."

"The owner of this abode will not leave us in it," said Abu Dharr.

Also, when the amir (governor) of Syria sent Abu Dharr three hundred dinars to meet his needs, he returned the money saying, "Does not the amir find a servant more deserving of it than I?"

Muhammad said about him:

"The earth does not carry nor the heavens cover a man more true and faithful than Abu Dharr."

Abu Dharr died in 652 CE.

=== Shi'a view ===
When Abu Dharr was exiled to al-Rabathah by Caliph Uthman bin Affan under duress from Muawiyah, (Note: This is disputed, with some sources alleging Abu Dharr was on a self-imposed exile from Medina) Ali and his sons, Hasan and Husayn, went to see him off. Ali said to him:

Abu Dharr, you've become very angry for Allah. The people are worried about their religion, and you are worried about your religion. So, leave what they are worried about in your hands and escape from them with what you're worried about. They're in need of what you've prevented them from. And you're in no need of what they've prevented you from. Tomorrow you'll know who will be the winner. Abu Dharr, nothing amuses you but the truth and nothing annoys you but the untruth.

Abu Dharr, his wife and his daughter were exiled to al-Rabathah, a rural town outside Madinah, as he recalled Muhammad's words:

"Abu Dharr, may Allah have mercy upon you. You'll live alone, die alone, rise from the dead alone and enter Paradise alone."

Abu Dharr was extremely devoted to Islam, and Muhammad is believed to have said about him:

Abu Dharr is like Isa ibn Maryam (Jesus) of my nation in his zuhd (asceticism) and wara' (piety).

and

Neither has the sky shaded one more truthful and honest than Abu Dhar nor has the earth had anyone walk over it like him.

Lebanon has two shrines dedicated to Abu Dharr commemorating his effort in spreading Islam, one in Sarepta and the other in Meiss al-Jabal.

== Legacy ==
=== Sunni view ===
Many hadiths (oral traditions) are traced to Abu Dharr. He is respected as an early and observant Muslim, renowned for being honest and direct. According to Sunni tradition, he was a rough and unlettered Bedouin who held no high office, but who served the Muslim community with everything he had to give.

=== Shi'a view ===
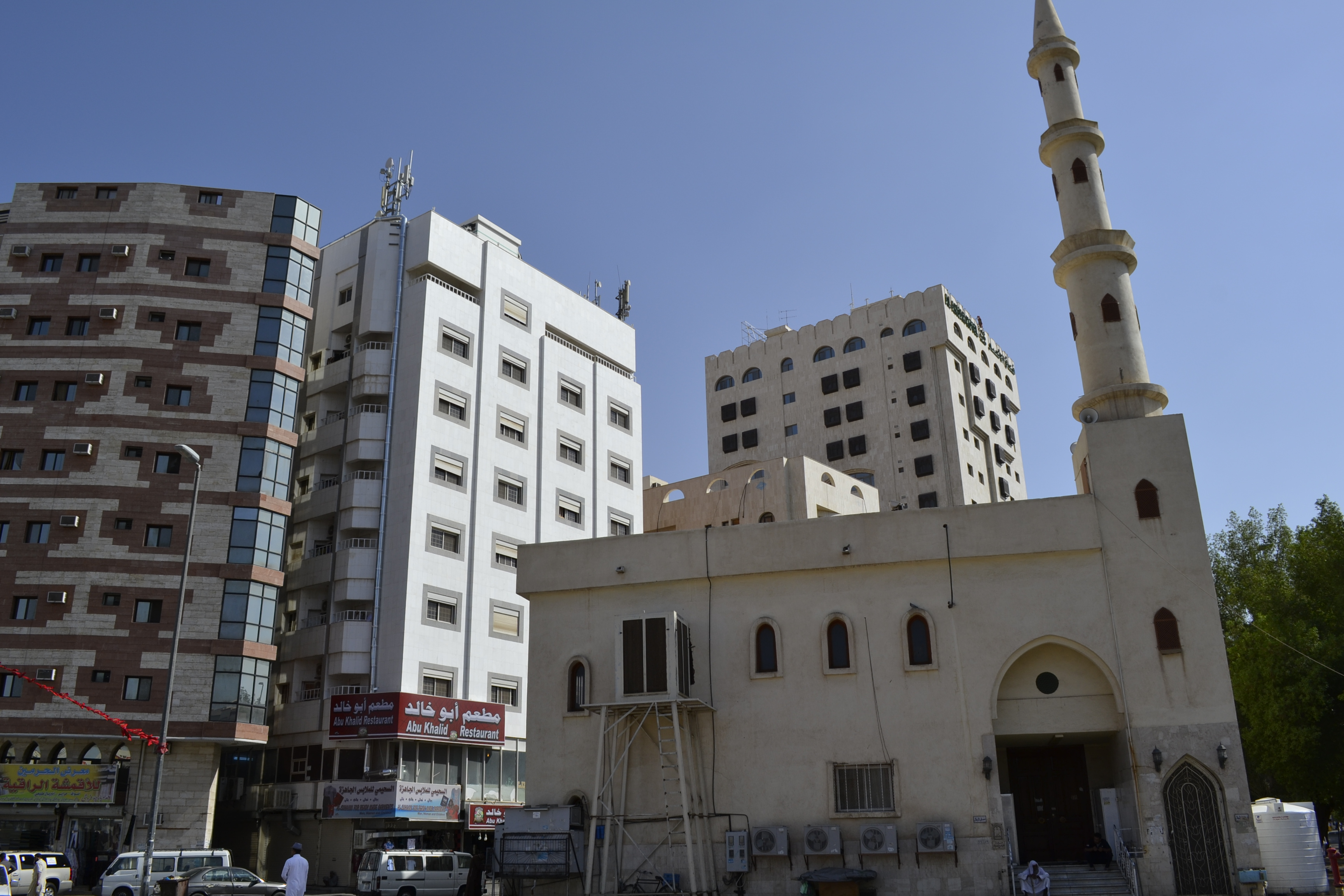
Abu Dhar Mosque

Aba Dharr is considered one of the greatest and most loyal sahaba, along with Salman the Persian, Miqdad ibn Aswad, and Ammar ibn Yasir.

== See also ==
- 7th century in Lebanon § Ṣaḥāba who have visited Lebanon
- Sahaba
- Sulaym ibn Qays
- Ghaffari
- Sunni view of the Sahaba
- Muadh ibn Jabal
