= Raid on al-Ghabah =

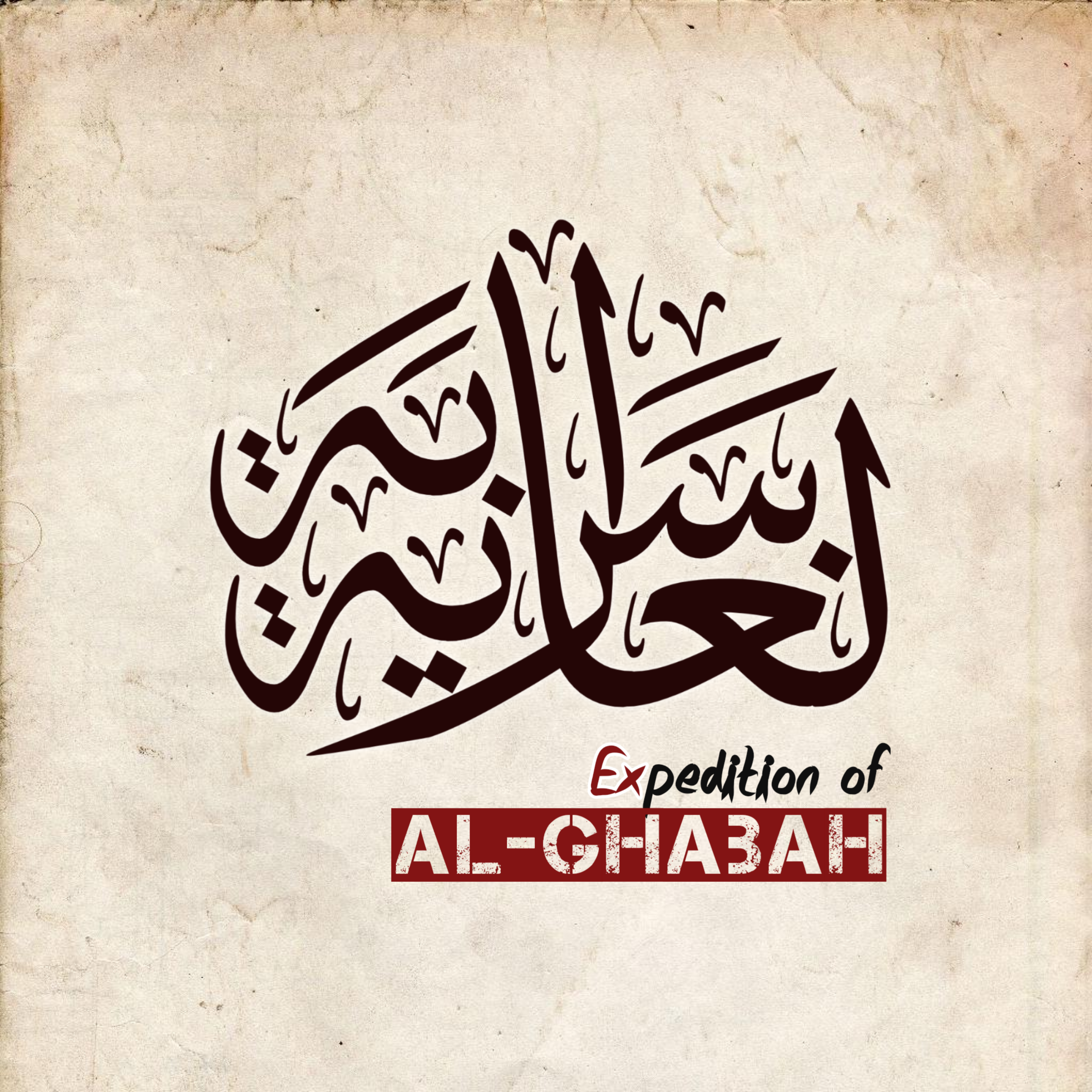
- Arabic calligraphy of text "Sariyah Al-Ghabah".
Date	627
Location	al-Ghabah
Result	Uyanah bin Hisn Al-Fazari kills 1 man and escapes with 20 of Muhammad's milch camels

Commanders and leaders
Amr ibn al-Akwa	Uyanah bin Hisn Al-Fazari

Strength
Unknown	Unknown

Casualties and losses
1 Muslim killed, 1 captured	None

Raid on al-Ghabah was a military expedition of the Islamic Prophet Muhammad that took place in 6AH of the Islamic calendar (i.e. 627 C.E). No orders given by Muhammad in this expedition but Amr ibn al-Akwa attacks Uyanah bin Hisn Al-Fazari after seeing him seize 20 of Muhammad's camels. One Muslim shepherd was killed, and his wife captured.

== Event during expedition ==
When Muhammad returned to Medina after the Invasion of Banu Lahyan. Uyanah bin Hisn Al-Fazari and horsemen of the Banu Ghatafan tribe raided the milch camels of Muhammad. They killed a man from the Banu Ghifar tribe, and kidnapped his wife

Amr ibn al-Akwa noticed what was happening and he followed them, and shot arrows at them and called for help throughout the chase. Muhammad later alerted the people of Medina and sent Muslim cavalry men as reinforcements.

== Islamic primary sources ==
The event is mentioned in Ibn Sa'd's Kitab al-tabaqat al-kabir, Volume 2

The event is also mentioned by the Muslim scholar Tabari, Volume 8, History of Islam as follows:

Then the Messenger of God returned to Medina. He has stayed only a few nights before Uayaynag b. Hisn b. Hudhhayfah b. Badr al-Fazari with horsemen of the Ghatafan raided the milch camels of the Messenger of God at al-Ghabah. Tending them were a man of the Banu Ghifar and his wife. They killed the man and carried off with the woman with the camels

[Tabari, Volume 8, History of Islam, p.43]

== See also ==
- List of battles of Muhammad
