= Jund Filastin =

District of the province of Bilad al-Sham

- Province of the Umayyad, Abbasid and Fatimid Caliphates
- 630s–late 11th century
- Early Islamic Syria (Bilad al-Sham) and its provinces under the Abbasid Caliphate in the 9th century
- Capital: c. 630s–c. 715: Ludd; c. 715–1099: Ramla
- History
  - Established: 630s
  - Seljuk attacks, First Crusade: late 11th century
- Contained within
  - Province: Bilad al-Sham
Preceded by	Succeeded by
Palaestina Prima	Kingdom of Jerusalem
- Today part of: Israel; Jordan; Palestine

Jund Filasṭīn (Arabic: جُنْد فِلَسْطِيْن, "the military district of Palestine") was one of the military districts of the Umayyad and Abbasid province of Bilad al-Sham (Levant), organized soon after the Muslim conquest of the Levant in the c. 630s CE. Jund Filastin, which encompassed most of Palaestina Prima and Palaestina Tertia, included the newly established city of Ramla as its capital and eleven administrative districts (kura), each ruled from a central town.

== History ==
=== Muslim conquest ===
The Muslim conquest of Syria Palaestina is difficult to reconstruct, according to the historian Dominique Sourdel. It is generally agreed that the Qurayshite commander Amr ibn al-As was sent to conquer the area by Caliph Abu Bakr, likely in 633 CE. Amr traversed the Red Sea coast of the Hejaz (western Arabia), reached the port town of Ayla at the head of the Gulf of Aqaba, then crossed into the Negev Desert or further west into the Sinai Peninsula. He then arrived to the villages of Dathin and Badan near Gaza, where he entered negotiations with the Byzantine garrison commander. The talks collapsed and the Muslims bested the Byzantines in the subsequent clash at Dathin in February or March 634. At this stage of the conquest Amr's troops encamped at Ghamr al-Arabat in the middle of the Araba Valley between the Dead Sea and the Gulf of Aqaba. The town of Gaza was left alone, with Amr's primary objective at the time being the subjugation of the Arab tribes in the vicinity.

After the Muslim armies led by Khalid ibn al-Walid captured Bosra in the Hauran in May 634 they crossed the Jordan River to reinforce Amr as he faced a large Byzantine army. In the ensuing Battle of Ajnadayn, fought at a site 25 kilometers (16 mi) southwest of Jerusalem in July or August, the Muslims under Amr's overall command routed the Byzantines. In the aftermath of Ajnadayn, Amr captured the towns of Sebastia, Nablus, Lydda, Yibna, Amwas, Bayt Jibrin and Jaffa. Most of these towns fell after minor resistance, hence the scant information available about them in the sources.

Following the decisive Muslim victory against the Byzantines at the Battle of Yarmouk (c. 636 CE), fought along the Yarmouk tributary of the Jordan River east of Palestine, Amr besieged Jerusalem, which held out until the arrival of Caliph Umar, to whom Jerusalem's leaders surrendered in c. 637 CE. The coastal towns of Gaza, Ascalon and Caesarea had continued to hold out. The commander Alqama ibn Mujazziz may have been sent against Byzantine forces in Gaza several times during and after Ajnadayn. Amr launched his conquest of Egypt from Jerusalem c. 640. Caesarea was besieged for a lengthy period and captured most likely by Mu'awiya ibn Abi Sufyan in 639, 640 or 641. Not long after, Mu'awiya captured Ascalon, completing the conquest of Palestine, most of which had been undertaken by Amr.

Filastin became one of the four original junds (military districts) of al-Sham (Islamic Syria) established by Caliph Umar. In effect, the Muslims maintained the preexisting administrative organization of the Byzantine district of Palaestina Prima.

=== Umayyad period ===
Umayyad rule (661–750) was a relatively prosperous period for Filastin and the Umayyad caliphs invested considerably in the district's development. According to Sourdel, "Palestine was particularly honoured in the Umayyad period". The first Umayyad caliph, Mu'awiya, who held overall authority over Syria, including Palestine, from the time of Caliph Uthman (r. 644–656), was first recognized as caliph in a ceremony in Jerusalem.

The Umayyad caliph Abd al-Malik (r. 685–705) built and repaired roads connecting the Umayyad capital at Damascus with Palestine and roads connecting Jerusalem to its eastern and western hinterlands, as evidenced by seven milestones found throughout the region, the oldest of which dates to May 692 and the latest to September 704. The milestones, all containing inscriptions crediting Abd al-Malik for the road works, were found, from north to south, in or near Fiq, Samakh, St. George's Monastery of Wadi Qelt, Khan al-Hathrura, Bab al-Wad and Abu Ghosh. The milestone found in Samakh dates to 692, the two milestones at Fiq both date to 704 and the remaining milestones are undated. The fragment of an eighth milestone, likely produced soon after Abd al-Malik's death, was found at Ein Hemed, immediately west of Abu Ghosh. The road project formed part of Abd al-Malik's centralization drive, special attention being paid to Palestine due to its critical position as a transit zone between Syria and Egypt and Jerusalem's religious centrality to the caliph.

In 685/86 or 688, Abd al-Malik began the construction of the Dome of the Rock in Jerusalem. Its dedication inscription mentions the year c. 691-692 CE, which most scholars agree is the completion date of the building. It is the earliest archaeologically attested religious structure to be built by a Muslim ruler and the building's inscriptions contain the earliest epigraphic proclamations of Islam and of Muhammad. He is also credited with constructing the adjacent Dome of the Chain, expanding the boundaries of the Temple Mount (Haram al-Sharif) to include the Foundation Stone around which the Dome of the Rock was built and building two gates of the Temple Mount (possibly the Mercy Gate and the Prophet's Gate).

Abd al-Malik appointed his son Sulayman as governor of Jund Filastin and he served through the reign of Abd al-Malik's successor, his other son al-Walid I (r. 705–715). Sulayman founded the city of Ramla during this period and it became the administrative capital of Jund Filastin until the Crusades, though Jerusalem remained the religious focal point of the region. Al-Walid continued his father's works on the Temple Mount, founding the al-Aqsa Mosque, and was the likely patron of the unfinished administrative and residential structures located along the southern and eastern walls of the Temple Mount. While Sulayman also built in Jerusalem, patronizing the construction of a bathhouse, he focused his attention on Ramla, building a palace, the White Mosque, and an aqueduct; from early on, Ramla commercially superseded its twin city of Lydda and developed into a market town for the agricultural output of its countryside and hub for weaving, dyeing, and pottery, and later for religious scholarship. In Jericho, Sulayman built arches, mills and gardens, but these were destroyed by floods during a later period. Sulayman succeeded al-Walid I but unlike his predecessors who ruled from Damascus, Sulayman ruled from his seat in Palestine where he had his support base.

=== Abbasid period ===
On the other hand, a change in the Syrian policy during the Abbasid period resulted in an overall decline in the region. The Levant was now further from the seat of authority as the capital relocated from Damascus to Baghdad. The new policy preferred Iraq over the Levant due to suspicion of the local Muslim population's loyalty, as they strongly identified with the Abbasid's rivals, the former Umayyad dynasty. Moreover, the Abbasids promoted trade with eastern lands such as Tang China and the Kingdoms of India. This led to neglect, political unrest, and occasionally local rebellions, one of which is the Al-Mubarqa. A process of urban decline is believed to have been accelerated by the 749 earthquake, which increased the number of Jews, Christians, and Samaritans who migrated to diaspora settlements while also leaving behind others who stayed in the devastated towns and impoverished villages until they embraced Islam.

== Geography ==
At its greatest extent, Filastin extended from Rafah in the south to Lajjun in the north, and from the Mediterranean coast well to the east of the southern part of the Jordan River. The mountains of Edom, and the town of Zoar (Sughar) at the southeastern end of the Dead Sea were included in the district. However, the Galilee was excluded, being part of Jund al-Urdunn in the north. Filastin roughly comprised the regions of Samaria, Judea, and the adjacent Mediterranean coastal plain from Mount Carmel in the north to Gaza in the south.

According to al-Baladhuri, the main towns of Filastin, following its conquest by the Rashidun Caliphate, were, from south to north, Rafah, Gaza, Bayt Jibrin, Yibna, Amwas, Lydda, Jaffa, Nablus, Sebastia, and Caesarea. Under Byzantine rule the port city of Caesarea was the territory's capital, a natural choice as it eased communications with the capital Constantinople. After the Muslim conquest, the administrative focus shifted to the interior. Amwas was referred to as a qasaba in the early Islamic sources; the term could refer to a central town, but most likely meant a fortified camp in the case of Amwas. It served as the principal military camp of the Muslim troops, where spoils were divided and stipends paid, until it was abandoned by the troops in 639 due to the plague of Amwas. From about 640 Ludd and/or Jerusalem have been determined as the capital or political-religious center of Filastin, according to modern historians. (Note: The historians Guy le Strange, Moshe Gil, Muhammad Adnan Bakhit, and N. Hamash considered Ludd the capital before the founding of Ramla, while Goitein and Amikam Elad considered Jerusalem as the district's political-religious center before Ramla's founding.)

After the caliph Sulayman ibn Abd al-Malik founded the city of Ramla next to Ludd, he designated it the capital, and most of Ludd's inhabitants were forced to settle there. In the 9th century, during Abbasid rule, Jund Filastin was the most fertile of Syria's districts, and contained at least twenty mosques, despite its small size.

After the Fatimids conquered the district from the Abbasids, Jerusalem eventually became the capital, and the principal towns were Ascalon, Ramla, Gaza, Arsuf, Caesarea, Jaffa, Jericho, Nablus, Bayt Jibrin, and Amman. The district persisted in some form until the Seljuk invasions and the Crusades of the late 11th century.

== Population ==
At the time of the Muslim conquest, Filastin had been inhabited mainly by Aramaic-speaking Miaphysite Christian peasants. Samaria, in the northern part of the district, had a large Samaritan population.

=== Arabization and Islamization ===
Two separate gradual demographic processes—cultural Arabization and religious Islamization—were initiated after the Islamic conquest. It is believed that the settlements of Arabians, both before and after the Muslim conquest contributed at least partially to the pace of Arabization and Islamization. The principal Arabian tribes which inhabited Filastin and formed its army were the Lakhm, Judham, Kinana, Khath'am, Khuza'a, and Azd Sarat. However, the inhabitants of Palestine did not become predominantly Muslim and Arab in identity until several centuries after the conquest with full Arabization achieved by the 9th century, and mass-Islamization not until the Mamluk period.

=== Jews ===
At the time of the Muslim conquest, Jewish communities were present within the territory of Jund Filastin, concentrated particularly in coastal urban centres such as Caesarea, Gaza, and Ascalon, as well as in Jerusalem; the denser Jewish populations of the Galilee fell primarily within the neighbouring district of Jund al-Urdunn. Like Christians and Samaritans, Jews were accorded dhimmī status under the new Muslim administration, granting communal autonomy in religious and juridical affairs in exchange for the payment of the jizya poll tax and formal political subordination. The Muslim conquest lifted the Byzantine prohibition on Jewish residence in Jerusalem, which had been in force since the Bar Kokhba revolt of 132–136 CE. Documentary evidence from the Cairo Geniza, analysed extensively by S. D. Goitein and Moshe Gil, attests to Jewish commercial and communal activity in Ramla and other towns of the district throughout the Umayyad, Abbasid, and Fatimid periods, and the Palestinian Gaonate — the principal rabbinic academy of medieval Palestine — was seated in Jerusalem by the mid-tenth century.

=== Samaritans ===
Samaria was one of the first regions in Jund Filastin to undergo a process of mass-conversions prior to the First Crusade. It was predominantly Samaritan and Christian during the Byzantine period, but during the early Islamic period, particularly under Abbasid and Tulunid rule, Samaria was gradually Islamized through the conversions of an indefinite yet large number of Samaritans as a result of religious persecution, high taxation, droughts, and warring, as well as migration by Arabian tribes. By the end of the 10th century, the rural Samaritan population had "disappeared," and the remaining Samaritans had concentrated in urban areas, with Nablus serving as a major center, but there was also a Samaritan diaspora, establishing communities in Caesarea and Askhelon, and even beyond Jund Filastin in Levantine cities such as Aleppo, Damascus, and Sarepta.

=== Melkites ===
The Christian Melkite community underwent a process of adoption of Arabic and Arabization, but was able to avoid Islamization and preserve its religious and cultural identity for a longer period of time until mass conversions to Islam in the Mamluk, as well as the Ottoman periods.

== Governors ==
The governors of Jund Filastin:

=== Rashidun period ===
- Amr ibn al-As and Alqama ibn Mujazziz al-Kinani (634–639; they were assigned as the commanders in charge of Filastin by Caliph Abu Bakr)
- Alqama ibn Mujazziz al-Kinani (639–641 or 644; when Amr left Filastin to conquer Egypt, Alqama was left as governor. One version in the Islamic tradition placed his death in 641, while another held that he was governor at the death of Caliph Umar in 644 According to one version Umar made Alqama governor of half of Filastin from his seat in Jerusalem, while Alqama ibn Hakim al-Kinani was appointed over the other half of Palestine from Ramla—Lydda is most likely meant here. This division may have been done following the plague of Amwas in 639.)
- Abd al-Rahman ibn Alqama al-Kinani (c. 644–645 or 646; governed for undetermined period during the reign of Umar's successor Caliph Uthman in 644–656)
- Mu'awiya ibn Abi Sufyan (645 or 646–661; appointed by Caliph Uthman after the death of Abd al-Rahman ibn Alqama; he was already governor of the junds of Dimashq and al-Urdunn under Umar was given authority over Jund Hims by Uthman)

=== Umayyad period ===
- Al-Harith ibn Abd al-Azdi (673/74–676/77; governed during the reign of Caliph Mu'awiya I)
- Hassan ibn Malik ibn Bahdal al-Kalbi (677?–684, governed during the reign of Caliph Mu'awiya I, the latter's son and Hassan's cousin Yazid I, and Yazid's son Mu'awiya II)
  - Rawh ibn Zinba al-Judhami (680–684, appointed by Hassan ibn Malik as his governor on his behalf)
- Abd al-Malik ibn Marwan (685–685; governed for his father Caliph Marwan I, succeeded the latter as caliph later in 685; his caliphal accession was in Jerusalem)
  - Rawh ibn Zinba al-Judhami (685–685; served as deputy governor for Abd al-Malik)
- Yahya ibn al-Hakam (governed for undetermined period in 685–694 for his nephew Caliph Abd al-Malik; inscription on a milestone dated to 692 was found at Samakh crediting him for a roadwork at Fiq, both places in neighboring Jund al-Urdunn; his tombstone was found near Katzrin, in Jund al-Urdunn)
- Aban ibn Marwan (governed for undetermined period during the rule of his brother Caliph Abd al-Malik)
- Sulayman ibn Abd al-Malik (pre-705–715; governed for part of his father Caliph Abd al-Malik's reign and the full reign of his brother al-Walid I: continued to rule from Palestine, either from Ramla or Jerusalem, until later moving to Jund Qinnasrin)
- Nadr ibn Yarim ibn Ma'dikarib ibn Abraha ibn al-Sabbah (717–720; governed during the reign of Caliph Umar II; a chief of the Himyar nobility of Jund Hims)
- Sa'id ibn Abd al-Malik (February 743–April 744; governed during the reign of his nephew Caliph al-Walid II)
- Yazid ibn Sulayman ibn Abd al-Malik (744–744; rebel governor installed by the troops of Palestine led by Rawh ibn Zinba's son Sa'id, who expelled Yazid's uncle Sa'id ibn Abd al-Malik)
- Dab'an ibn Rawh ibn Zinba al-Judhami (744–745; appointed by Caliph Yazid III after the surrender of the rebel troops of Palestine)
- Thabit ibn Nu'aym al-Judhami (745–745; was chosen by the troops of Palestine as their governor and swore allegiance to Caliph Marwan II before rebelling against him shortly after)
- Al-Rumahis ibn Abd al-Aziz al-Kinani (745–750; appointed governor by Marwan II during Thabit's revolt and continued in office until the Abbasid Revolution) (Note: In another version, a man of the Judham, Dab'an ibn Rawh ibn Zinba's son al-Hakam, seized power in Palestine in 750 during the Abbasid Revolution, after which Caliph Marwan II, who had entered the district during his flight to Egypt, appointed another al-Hakam's uncle, Abd Allah ibn Yazid ibn Rawh, but he was unable to wrest power from al-Hakam.)

=== Abbasid period ===
- Salih ibn Ali (751–753; governed during the reign of his nephew Caliph al-Saffah)
- Abd al-Wahhab ibn Ibrahim (–775)
- Nasr ibn Muhammad ibn al-Ash'ath al-Khuza'i (777–777; governed during the reign of Caliph al-Mahdi but reassigned to Sind in the same year)
- Ibrahim ibn Salih (–780)
- Al-Fadl ibn Rawh ibn Hatim al-Muhallabi (–787)
- Ibrahim ibn Salih (787–)
- Harthama ibn A'yan (–796; a mawla of the Banu Dabba tribe; reassigned to Egypt).
- Sulayman ibn Abi Ja'far (809–811; appointed by his great nephew Caliph al-Amin, his governorship included Damascus and Homs)
- Bugha al-Saghir (863–; appointed by Caliph al-Musta'in)

=== Fatimid period ===
Information about the Fatimid provincial administration in Filastin, as with the other provinces in Bilad al-Sham, is scant, and largely limited to the period of 1023–1025, which was covered by the surviving fragment of the chronicle of al-Musabbihi (d. 1029). It is not clear to what degree the governor (wali) of Filastin's capital of Ramla was responsible for the rest of the province. The governor of Ramla was in charge of the local police force, but the qadi (head judge) in the city was appointed directly by the caliph's court as was the auditor (zimmam) of the fiscal administrator (amil) of Filastin. At least one military governor (mutawali harb) of Filastin, Anushtakin al-Dizbari, is named. Other cities in Filastin, including Jerusalem, Caesarea, and Asqalan, also had their own governors, with the governors of Asqalan at one point holding the highest rank of any provincial governor in the Fatimid Caliphate.

- Anushtakin al-Dizbari (1023–1026; governed during the reign of Caliph al-Zahir)

== See also ==
- History of Jerusalem during the Early Muslim period
- Syria (region)
- Syria Palaestina
- 'Ubadah ibn al-Samit

== Sources ==
- Bacharach, Jere L. (1996). "Marwanid Umayyad Building Activities: Speculations on Patronage". Muqarnas Online. 13. Brill: 27–44. doi:10.1163/22118993-90000355. ISSN 2211-8993. JSTOR 1523250.
- Bacharach, Jere L. (2010). "Signs of Sovereignty: The "Shahāda", the Qurʾanic Verses, and the Coinage of ʿAbd al-Malik". Muqarnas Online. 27. Brill: 1–30. doi:10.1163/22118993_02701002. ISSN 2211-8993. JSTOR 25769690.
- Blankinship, Khalid Yahya, ed. (1993). The History of al-Ṭabarī, Volume XI: The Challenge to the Empires. SUNY Series in Near Eastern Studies. Albany, New York: State University of New York Press. ISBN 978-0-7914-0851-3.
- Crone, Patricia (1980). Slaves on Horses: The Evolution of the Islamic Polity (1980 ed.). Cambridge: Cambridge University Press. ISBN 978-0521229616.
- Cytryn-Silverman, Katia (2007). "The Fifth Mīl from Jerusalem: Another Umayyad Milestone from Southern Bilād al-Shām". Bulletin of the School of Oriental and African Studies. 70 (3). Cambridge University Press: 603–610. doi:10.1017/S0041977X07000857. JSTOR 40378940. S2CID 162314029.
- Eisener, R. (1997). "Sulaymān b. ʿAbd al-Malik". In Bosworth, C. E.; van Donzel, E.; Heinrichs, W. P. & Lecomte, G. (eds.). The Encyclopaedia of Islam, Second Edition. Volume IX: San–Sze. Leiden: E. J. Brill. pp. 821–822. ISBN 978-90-04-10422-8.
- Donner, Fred M. (1981). The Early Islamic Conquests. Princeton: Princeton University Press. ISBN 0-691-05327-8.
- Elad, Amikam (1999). Medieval Jerusalem and Islamic Worship: Holy Places, Ceremonies, Pilgrimage (2nd ed.). Leiden: Brill. ISBN 90-04-10010-5.
- Friedmann, Yohanan, ed. (1992). The History of al-Ṭabarī, Volume XII: The Battle of al-Qādisīyyah and the Conquest of Syria and Palestine. SUNY Series in Near Eastern Studies. Albany, New York: State University of New York Press. ISBN 978-0-7914-0733-2.
- Gil, Moshe (1997) [1983]. A History of Palestine, 634–1099. Translated by Ethel Broido. Cambridge: Cambridge University Press. ISBN 0-521-59984-9.
- Gundelfinger, Simon; Verkinderen, Peter (2020). "The Governors of al-Sham and Fars in the Early Islamic Empire - A Comparative Regional Perspective". In Hagemann, Hannah-Lena; Heidemann, Stefan (eds.). Elites — Connecting the Early Islamic Empire. Berlin: Walter de Gruyter. pp. 255–330. ISBN 978-3-11-066648-9.
- Hawting, Gerald R. (2000). The First Dynasty of Islam: The Umayyad Caliphate AD 661–750 (Second ed.). London and New York: Routledge. ISBN 0-415-24072-7.
- Hillenbrand, Carole, ed. (1989). The History of al-Ṭabarī, Volume XXVI: The Waning of the Umayyad Caliphate: Prelude to Revolution, A.D. 738–744/A.H. 121–126. SUNY Series in Near Eastern Studies. Albany, New York: State University of New York Press. ISBN 978-0-88706-810-2.
- Humphreys, R. Stephen, ed. (1990). The History of al-Ṭabarī, Volume XV: The Crisis of the Early Caliphate: The Reign of ʿUthmān, A.D. 644–656/A.H. 24–35. SUNY Series in Near Eastern Studies. Albany, New York: State University of New York Press. ISBN 978-0-7914-0154-5.
- Johns, Jeremy (January 2003). "Archaeology and the History of Early Islam: The First Seventy Years". Journal of the Economic and Social History of the Orient. 46 (4): 411–436. doi:10.1163/156852003772914848. S2CID 163096950.
- Kennedy, Hugh (2004) [1986]. The Prophet and the Age of the Caliphates: The Islamic Near East from the 6th to the 11th Century (Second ed.). Harlow: Longman. ISBN 978-0-582-40525-7.
- Lecker, Michael (1989). "The Estates of 'Amr b. al-'Āṣ in Palestine: Notes on a New Negev Arabic Inscription". Bulletin of the School of Oriental and African Studies, University of London. 52 (1): 24–37. doi:10.1017/S0041977X00023041. JSTOR 617911. S2CID 163092638.
- Lev, Yaacov (2003). "Turks in the Political and Military Life of Eleventh-Century Egypt and Syria". In Hidemitsu, Kuroki (ed.). The Influence of Human Mobility in Muslim Societies. Kegan Paul. ISBN 0710308027.
- Luz, Nimrod (April 1997). "The Construction of an Islamic City in Palestine. The Case of Umayyad al-Ramla". Journal of the Royal Asiatic Society. 7 (1): 27–54. doi:10.1017/S1356186300008300. JSTOR 25183294. S2CID 163178178.
- Mayer, L. A. (1952). "As-Sinnabra". Israel Exploration Society. 2 (3): 183–187. JSTOR 27924483.
- Saliba, George, ed. (1985). The History of al-Ṭabarī, Volume XXXV: The Crisis of the ʿAbbāsid Caliphate: The Caliphates of al-Mustaʿīn and al-Muʿtazz, A.D. 862–869/A.H. 248–255. SUNY Series in Near Eastern Studies. Albany, New York: State University of New York Press. ISBN 978-0-87395-883-7.
- Sharon, Moshe (June 1966). "An Arabic Inscription from the Time of the Caliph 'Abd al-Malik". Bulletin of the School of Oriental and African Studies. 29 (2): 367–372. doi:10.1017/S0041977X00058900. S2CID 162899475.
- Sharon, Moshe (1997). Corpus Inscriptionum Arabicarum Palaestinae (CIAP): A. Volume One. Leiden and Boston: Brill. ISBN 90-04-10833-5.
- Sharon, Moshe (2004). Corpus Inscriptionum Arabicarum Palaestinae (CIAP): D-F. Volume Three. Leiden and Boston: Brill. ISBN 90-04-13197-3.
- Sourdel, D. (1965). "Filasṭīn — I. Palestine under Islamic Rule". In Lewis, B.; Pellat, Ch. & Schacht, J. (eds.). The Encyclopaedia of Islam, Second Edition. Volume II: C–G. Leiden: E. J. Brill. pp. 910–913. OCLC 495469475.
- Williams, John Alden, ed. (1985). The History of al-Ṭabarī, Volume XXVII: The ʿAbbāsid Revolution, A.D. 743–750/A.H. 126–132. SUNY Series in Near Eastern Studies. Albany, New York: State University of New York Press. ISBN 978-0-87395-884-4.
- Taxel, Itamar (May 2013). "Rural Settlement Processes in Central Palestine, ca. 640–800 C.E.: The Ramla-Yavneh Region as a Case Study". Bulletin of the American Schools of Oriental Research. 369 (369). The American Schools of Oriental Research: 157–199. doi:10.5615/bullamerschoorie.369.0157. JSTOR 10.5615/bullamerschoorie.369.0157. S2CID 163507411.
- Wensinck, A. J. (1960). "ʿAmr b. al-ʿĀṣ al-Sahmī". In Gibb, H. A. R.; Kramers, J. H.; Lévi-Provençal, E.; Schacht, J.; Lewis, B. & Pellat, Ch. (eds.). The Encyclopaedia of Islam, Second Edition. Volume I: A–B. Leiden: E. J. Brill. p. 451. OCLC 495469456.
