= Rumahis ibn Abd al-Aziz =

Rumahis ibn Abd al-Aziz al-Kinani (Arabic: رماحس بن عبد العزيز الكناني, romanized: Rumāḥis ibn ʿAbd al-ʿAzīz al-Kinānī) (fl. 745 – 781) was the governor of Jund Filastin (the military district of Palestine) under the Umayyad caliph Marwan II (r. 745–750) and the governor of Algeciras under the Umayyad Emir of Cordoba, Abd al-Rahman I (r. 756–788).

== Life ==
Rumahis belonged to the Kinana tribe. According to the 8th-century Arab genealogist Ibn al-Kalbi, Rumahis was a fourteenth-generation descendant of the tribe's eponymous progenitor and belonged to the Malik branch of the tribe. His father was Abd al-Aziz ibn Rumahis. During the Muslim conquest in the 630s, the Kinana had established a significant presence in Palestine, becoming one of the leading components of Palestine's tribal garrison. Rumahis was from Ramla, the capital of Palestine.

As a Kinani, he was part of the Qays tribo-political faction, in opposition to the Yaman faction. The Umayyad caliph Marwan II, who favored the Qays, appointed Rumahis the head of his shurta (elite guard). The Caliph also appointed him the governor of Palestine in 745 after suppressing and executing the incumbent governor Thabit ibn Nu'aym of the Yamani Judham, another of Palestine's well-established tribes.

When the Umayyads were toppled by the Abbasids in 750, Rumahis escaped to Egypt with Marwan II, who was later tracked down and killed. From Egypt, Rumahis relocated to al-Andalus (Islamic Spain) where many Umayyads and their loyalists found refuge. An Umayyad prince, Abd al-Rahman I, established an emirate in al-Andalus in 756 and Rumahis thereafter entered his service. He was appointed the governor of Algeciras and Sidonia, both areas being the tribal territory of the Kinani tribesmen of al-Andalus.

Rumahis later began to disregard the Emir's rule and launched a rebellion against him in 780. Rumahis captured and imprisoned clients of the Umayyad dynasty from the Emirate's capital Cordoba. In the following year, Abd al-Rahman launched a surprise attack against Rumahis, but the latter escaped and fled to the Maghreb (western North Africa). The Banu Rumahis, descendants of Rumahis, became a prominent political-military family in al-Andalus.

== Bibliography ==
- Crone, Patricia (1980). Slaves on Horses: The Evolution of the Islamic Polity. Cambridge: Cambridge University Press. ISBN 0-521-52940-9.
- Gil, Moshe (1997) [1983]. A History of Palestine, 634–1099. Translated by Ethel Broido. Cambridge: Cambridge University Press. ISBN 0-521-59984-9.
- Meouak, Mohamed (1992). "Les Banu l-Rumahis et les Banu Tumlus, fonctionnaires au service de l'etat Hispano-Umayyade". In Marin, Manuela; Zanon, Jesus (eds.). Estudios onomástico-biográficos de al-Andalus, V (Familias Andalusies) (in French). Madrid: CSIC Press. ISBN 84-00-07265-0.
- Navarro, Xavier Ballestin (2004). Una nissaga de poder viatgera i inquieta: els Omeies de Damasc a Còrdova (in Catalan). Barcelona: Publicacions i Ediciones. ISBN 84-475-2831-6.
