= Banu Ghifar =

The Banu Ghifar (Arabic: بنو غفار, romanized: Banū Ghifār) was an Arab tribe that belonged to the Banu Damra ibn Bakr, a branch of the large Kinana tribe in the Hejaz region of Arabia. They were sometimes derided as brigands and robbers by other Arabs in the region. The formerly-polytheistic tribe converted to Islam in the time of Muhammad, with Abu Dhar al-Ghifari being among the first of the Banu Ghifar to convert. The Banu Ghifar had at least two sub-clans, the Banu al-Nar and Banu Huraq, who lived near the city of Medina. The tribe joined the early Islamic conquests after their conversion, and some of them moved into Medina itself in later years. A number of the Banu Ghifar supported the rebellion of Muhammad al-Nafs al-Zakiyya against the Abbasid caliphate.
