= Tasm and Jadis =

Now-extinct Arab tribes

Tasm and Jadis طسم وجديس
- Extinct Arabs
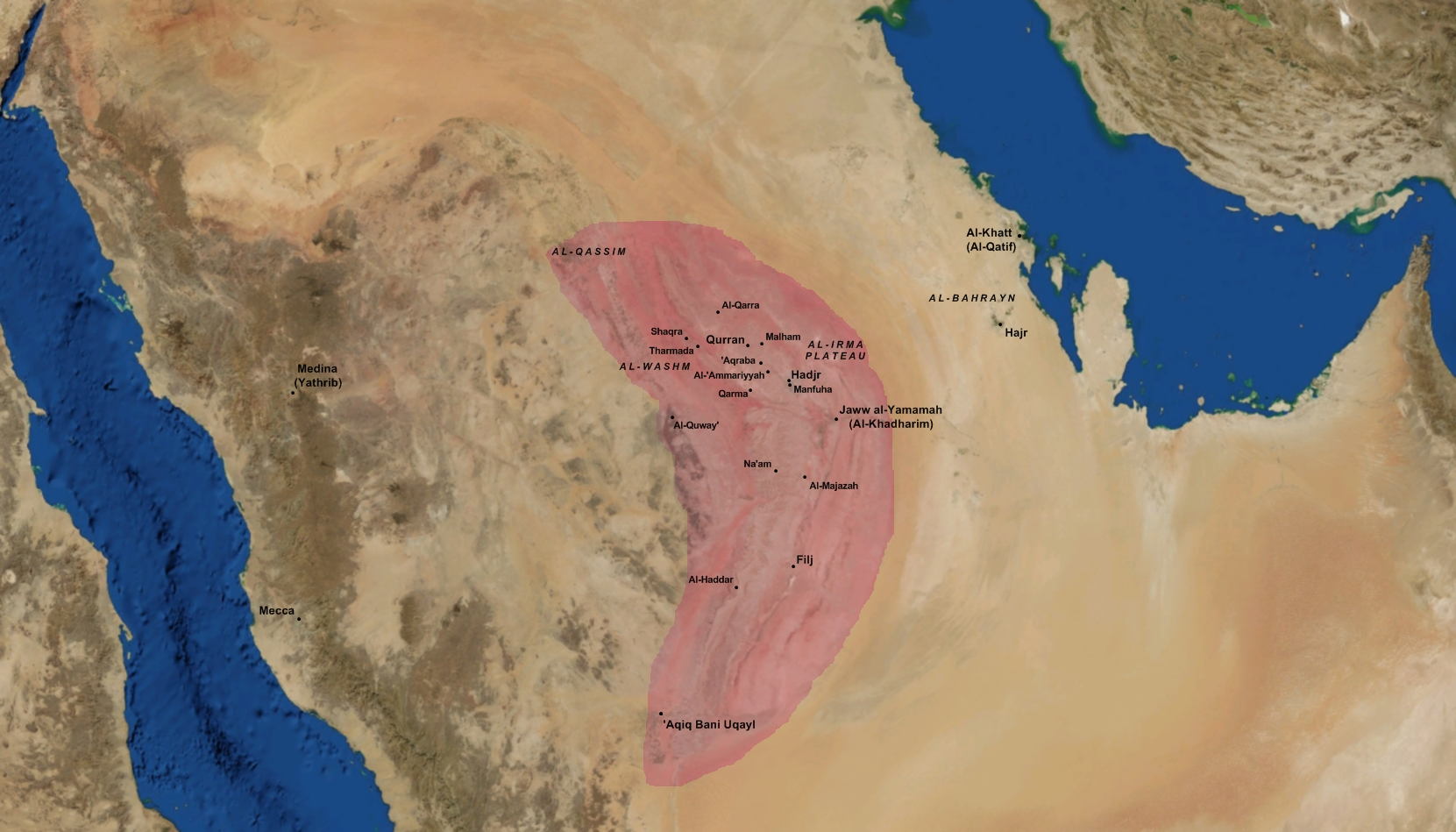
- Highlighted in red are the areas which the Tasm and Jadis dominated.
- Ethnicity: Arab
- Nisba: Tasmi and Jadisi
- Location: Najd
- Descended from: Shem
- Religion: South Arabian polytheism

Tasm and Jadis (Arabic: طسم وجديس) were two extinct Arab tribes that dominated the region of Al-Yamama in the Arabian Peninsula during ancient times. They are traditionally believed to have been descended from Shem, the son of the biblical patriarch Noah. Tasm and Jadis were active from around approximately 110 BCE until they were both entirely wiped out by the Himyarite Kingdom in the 6th century CE.

== Tribal lineage ==
The tribes are believed to have been descended from the similarly-named Tasm and Jadis, two Arabian patriarchs who are the grandsons of Shem. There is a difference in opinion of the father of Tasm and Jadis; while it is believed that Tasm is a son of Lud, there is dispute whether Jadis was a son of Lud or a son of Aram. The Buyid-period philosopher and historian, Miskawayh, stated that both patriarchs were the sons of Lud.

== History ==
The tribes of Tasm and Jadis are believed to have already settled in the area by 110 BCE. They were contemporary to other Arabian tribes like the Amalek, 'Ad, and Thamud. They settled together in the region of Al-Yamama in the Arabian Peninsula, where they became a civilisation and an independent kingdom.

Yaqut al-Hamawi mentions that both Tasm and Jadis had built several palaces and fortresses in Al-Yamama that were eventually taken over and used by the Banu Hanifa tribe after the Tasm and Jadis had become extinct.

=== Extinction ===
By the 6th century CE, the Tasm tribe prevailed over the Jadis. (Note: The rule of Hassan Yuha'min is in the 6th century CE, hence the events are dated to around this time.) Both tribes were ruled by a king named Imliq, who had a policy of Droit du seigneur where he would deflower the virgins of Jadis before their marriage. Another tradition states that the king implemented a law which granted him full control the trade routes. Whatever the case, Jadis was unhappy with their ruler, Imliq; and one day when the king was invited to a special performance, several men from the Jadis revealed their swords from the sand and then pounced upon Imliq, killing him.

The Jadis tribe was ignorant of the incoming Himyarite armies; despite constant warnings from a woman from their own tribe that they would be invaded, they ignored her and did not believe her. At last the force of Himyarites entered Al-Yamama and killed all of the unprepared Jadis tribe, except for the children who were taken into slavery.

At some point of time, the Tasm tribe also became extinct. Both Tasm and Jadis have been listed as amongst the al-Arab al-Ba'ida (extinct Arabian tribes) by some scholars, such as Safiur Rahman Mubarakpuri and Mostafa Saadeq Al-Rafe'ie.

== Legacy ==
The lives of the Tasm and Jadis, as told in the Arabian traditions, were adapted into a live-action drama series known as Akher Ayyam Al Yamama (The Last Days of Al Yamama), starring Ghassan Massoud. The Jordanian-origin series was first released in 2005 and has 30 episodes in total. It focuses on the rivalries and conflicts within both tribes which eventually leads to their destruction.

== See also ==
- Tribes of Arabia
