= Expedition of Alqammah bin Mujazziz =

The Expedition of Alqammah bin Mujazziz, took place in September 630 (9 AH, fourth month of the Islamic calendar). This expedition was dispatched to fight against some men from the Kingdom of Aksum, who gathered near the shores of Jeddah. The Ethiopians approached Mecca using boats from the sea, leading some Muslims to flee the area, suspecting the Ethiopians of being pirates.

News reached Muhammad, who sent 'Alqamah bin Mujazziz Al-Mudlaji to the shores of Jeddah, with 300 men. The Muslim fighters crossed the sea until they got to an island. But as soon as the suspected pirates had learned of the Muslims' arrival, they fled.

== Islamic primary sources ==
The event is also mentioned by the Muslim Scholar Ibn Sa'd in his book "Kitab al-tabaqat al-kabir", as follows:

Then (occurred) the sariyyah of 'Alqamah Ibn Mujazziz al- Mudliji against al-Habashah in the month of Rabi' al-Akhar... They (narrators) said: A report reached the Apostle of Allah, may Allah bless him, that the people of Juddah had seen the people of al-Habashah (Abyssinia). Thereupon he sent 'Alqamah lbn Mujazziz at the head of three hundred persons. He reached an island in the sea. When the (tide) rose in front of them they ran away from it. When it reached, some people hastened to go to their families and he permitted them. 'Abd Allah H lbn Hudhafah al-Sahmi also wanted to go so he (Alqamah) appointed him the leader of those who were going. He had some humour in him. They halted on the way, enkindled fire to warm themselves and to cook (food). On this he said : I have resolved (not to proceed) unless you jump into this fire. Some of them stood up and throngned, till he had the impression that they were about to jump. Then he said: Sit down ! I was simply jesting with you. They mentioned it to the Apostle of Allah, may Allah bless him. He said : Do not obey him who orders you to commit a sin.

== See also ==
- Military career of Muhammad
- List of expeditions of Muhammad
