= Abd Allah ibn Amr ibn Ghaylan =

Umayyad governor Abd Allah ibn Amr

Abd Allah ibn Amr ibn Ghaylan al-Thaqafi

Umayyad governor of Basra
- In office 674–675
- Monarch: Mu'awiya I (r. 661–680)
- Preceded by: Samura ibn Jundab
- Succeeded by: Ubaydallah ibn Ziyad

Personal details
- Parent: Amr ibn Ghaylan al-Thaqafi

Abd Allah ibn Amr ibn Ghaylan al-Thaqafi (Arabic: عبدالله بن عمرو بن غيلان الثقفي) was the Umayyad governor of Basra in 674. In 665 he served as the head of the shurta (elite troops) of the governor of Basra, al-Harith ibn Amr al-Azdi, who served a four-month term before being replaced by Ziyad ibn Abihi. Abd Allah was appointed by Caliph Mu'awiya I (r. 661–680) in place of Samura ibn Jundab. He served for six months and appointed Abd Allah ibn Hisn as the head of his shurta. During one of his Friday prayer sermons tribesmen of the Banu Dabba hurled stones at him, prompting him to have one of the assailants' hand amputated. Prompted by the Dabba's complaints about the amputation, Mu'awiya replaced Abd Allah with Ziyad's son Ubaydallah ibn Ziyad.

== Bibliography ==
- Morony, Michael G., ed. (1987). The History of al-Ṭabarī, Volume XVIII: Between Civil Wars: The Caliphate of Muʿāwiyah, 661–680 A.D./A.H. 40–60. SUNY Series in Near Eastern Studies. Albany, New York: State University of New York Press. ISBN 978-0-87395-933-9.
