= Alqama ibn Mujazziz al-Kinani =

Alqama ibn Mujazziz al-Mudliji al-Kinani (Arabic: علقمة بن مجزز المدلجي الكناني) was an early Muslim commander under the Islamic prophet Muhammad and the caliphs Abu Bakr (r. 632–634) and Umar (r. 634–644). He was a leading commander and governor of Jund Filastin (the military district of Palestine) under Abu Bakr, Umar, and possibly for a relatively short period under Uthman (r. 644–656).

== Life ==
Alqama's father was a certain Mujazziz or Muharriz of the Mudlij branch of the Kinana tribe. From 630 the Islamic prophet Muhammad appointed him a commander of a number of expeditions, and he continued as a commander after Muhammad's death under Caliph Abu Bakr (r. 632–634).

Abu Bakr dispatched Alqama to lead the conquest of Palestine with Amr ibn al-As. In 636 or 637 Caliph Umar appointed Alqama as governor of half of the newly created military district of Jund Filastin headquartered in Jerusalem. Alqama is another, Alqama ibn Hakim al-Kinani, was appointed over the other half of Palestine. According to one version of the Islamic tradition Alqama was charged with confronting Byzantine troops concentrated in Gaza.

According one version in the Islamic tradition Muhammad had appointed Alqama to command a naval operation against the Abyssinian Empire in 630 or 631, and the mission was successful. In another version, Alqama was appointed to lead the same operation by Umar in 641, in the course of which Alqama was slain. According to a report of the 8th-century historian Sayf ibn Umar, Alqama had been governor of Palestine at the time of Umar's death in 644, while he also held that during the first two years of Uthman's reign, i.e. 644–646, Alqama's son Abd al-Rahman had been governor. After Abd al-Rahman's death Jund Filastin was attached to the Syrian governorship of Mu'awiya ibn Abi Sufyan.

== Bibliography ==
- Blankinship, Khalid Yahya, ed. (1993). The History of al-Ṭabarī, Volume XI: The Challenge to the Empires. SUNY Series in Near Eastern Studies. Albany, New York: State University of New York Press. ISBN 978-0-7914-0851-3.
- Donner, Fred M. (1981). The Early Islamic Conquests. Princeton: Princeton University Press. ISBN 0-691-05327-8.
- Donner, Fred M., ed. (1993). The History of al-Ṭabarī, Volume X: The Conquest of Arabia, A.D. 632–633/A.H. 11. SUNY Series in Near Eastern Studies. Albany, New York: State University of New York Press. ISBN 978-0-7914-1071-4.
- Friedmann, Yohanan, ed. (1992). The History of al-Ṭabarī, Volume XII: The Battle of al-Qādisīyyah and the Conquest of Syria and Palestine. SUNY Series in Near Eastern Studies. Albany, New York: State University of New York Press. ISBN 978-0-7914-0733-2.
- Gil, Moshe (1997) [1983]. A History of Palestine, 634–1099. Translated by Ethel Broido. Cambridge: Cambridge University Press. ISBN 0-521-59984-9.
- Humphreys, R. Stephen, ed. (1990). The History of al-Ṭabarī, Volume XV: The Crisis of the Early Caliphate: The Reign of ʿUthmān, A.D. 644–656/A.H. 24–35. SUNY Series in Near Eastern Studies. Albany, New York: State University of New York Press. ISBN 978-0-7914-0154-5.
