= Al-Harith ibn Abd Allah al-Azdi =

7th century Umayyad governor and commander

Al-Harith ibn Abd Allah al-Azdi, also referred to in sources as al-Harith ibn Abd, al-Harith ibn Amr or al-Harith ibn Abd Amr (fl. 665–677) was the Umayyad governor of Basra for four months in early 665 under Caliph Mu'awiya I (r. 661–680). Later, he served as the governor of his home territory of Palestine and/or the commander of Palestine's troops in the mid-670s.

== Life ==
He was a tribesman of the Azd from Palestine, where the Azd made up a significant proportion of the district's Arab population.

In the spring of 665 Mu'awiya appointed al-Harith as governor of Basra in place of Abd Allah ibn Amir. Al-Harith made Abd Allah ibn Amr ibn Ghaylan the head of his shurta (select troops). According to al-Tabari (d. 923), al-Harith had been appointed by Mu'awiya as a placeholder to make way for Ziyad ibn Abihi, who became governor four months after al-Harith.

The historians Patricia Crone and Moshe Gil identified him as the "Harith ibn Abd" mentioned as the governor of Palestine under the Umayyad caliph Mu'awiya I (r. 661–680) in the Arabic and Greek papyri of Nitzana, dated to October 674–February 677. The traditional Muslim sources mention him as the commander of the troops of Palestine under Mu'awiya.

== Bibliography ==
- Crone, Patricia (1980). Slaves on Horses: The Evolution of the Islamic Polity. Cambridge: Cambridge University Press. ISBN 0-521-52940-9.
- Crone, Patricia (1994). "Were the Qays and Yemen of the Umayyad Period Political Parties?". Der Islam. 71: 1–57. doi:10.1515/islm.1994.71.1.1. S2CID 154370527.
- Gil, Moshe (1997) [1983]. A History of Palestine, 634–1099. Translated by Ethel Broido. Cambridge: Cambridge University Press. ISBN 0-521-59984-9.
- Morony, Michael G., ed. (1987). The History of al-Ṭabarī, Volume XVIII: Between Civil Wars: The Caliphate of Muʿāwiyah, 661–680 A.D./A.H. 40–60. SUNY Series in Near Eastern Studies. Albany, New York: State University of New York Press. ISBN 978-0-87395-933-9.
