= Samura ibn Jundab =

Companion of Muhammad

Samura ibn Jundab al-Fazari
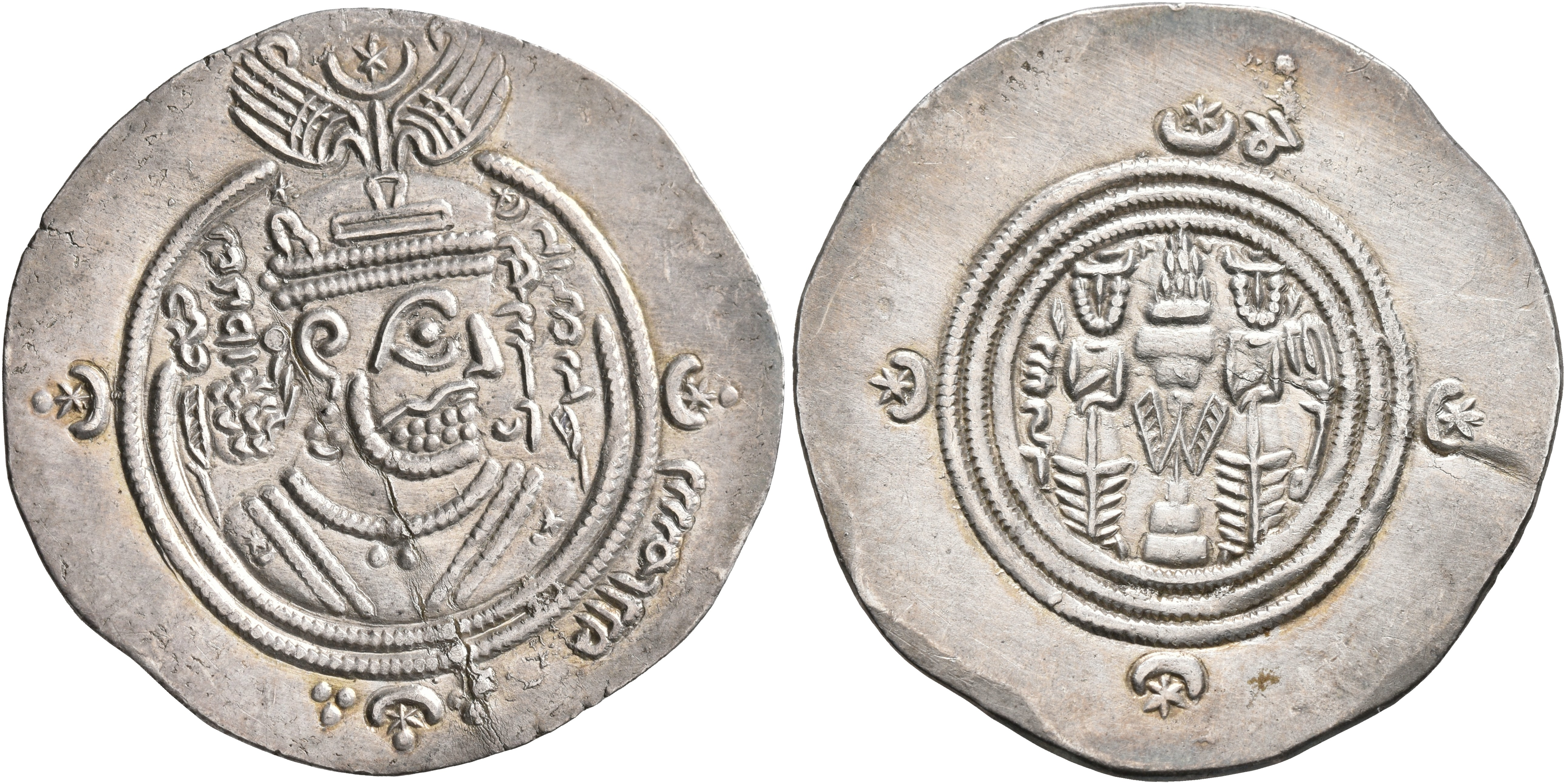
- Silver dirham of the Arab–Sasanian type minted in the name of Samura ibn Jundab (inscribed in Persian on obverse) in Darabjird, 672–673.

Umayyad governor of Basra
- In office 670–674
- Monarch: Mu'awiya I (r. 661–680)
- Preceded by: Ziyad ibn Abihi
- Succeeded by: Abd Allah ibn Amr ibn Ghaylan

Personal details
- Died: 677–679 Basra, Umayyad Caliphate
- Relations: Fazara (paternal tribe); Ansar (affiliate tribe)
- Children: Sa'd or Sa'id; Sulayman; Umm Thabit
- Parents: Jundab ibn Hilal al-Fazari (father); Murayy ibn Sinan ibn Tha'laba (stepfather)

Samura ibn Jundab al-Fazārī (Arabic: سمرة بن جندب, his father Jundab's name is also commonly transliterated as Jundub; died 677–679) was a companion of the Islamic prophet Muhammad who fought at the Battle of Uhud in 627 and later participated in the Muslim conquest of Iran in the 630s–640s. In 670–673 he served as the lieutenant governor of Basra under Ziyad ibn Abihi, the supreme governor of Iraq and the eastern Umayyad Caliphate. During his deputy rule over Basra, he is held by the Islamic traditional sources to have ordered wide-scale executions of Kharijites in his jurisdiction. He remained governor of Basra under the Umayyad caliph Mu'awiya I (r. 661–680) for six to eighteen months after Ziyad's death in August/September 673 until the Caliph replaced him.

== Origins and early life ==
Samura ibn Jundab belonged to the Banu Lay clan of the Shamkh branch of the Fazara, a nomadic Arab tribe, itself a division of the Ghatafan confederation, which dwelt in the part of the Hejaz (western Arabia) Medina. His father was the Fazari tribesman Jundab ibn Hilal ibn Harij ibn Murra ibn Hazn. Samura's widowed mother was remarried to Murayy ibn Sinan ibn Tha'laba, a member of the Ansar (supporters of the Islamic prophet Muhammad from Medina). Through his stepfather he became an affiliate of the Banu Khudra clan of the Khazraj, one of the two tribal divisions of the Ansar.

As a youth Samura became a companion of Muhammad. According to the history of al-Waqidi (d. 823), he fought in Muhammad's ranks at the Battle of Uhud in 627, after convincing Muhammad of his prowess when the Islamic prophet wanted to send him back to Medina due to his young age. He later participated in the Muslim conquest of Sasanian Iran (630s–640s), and was appointed the lieutenant governor of Suq al-Ahwaz in the region of Khuzistan by Abu Musa al-Ash'ari, the governor of Basra, one of the two main Arab garrison towns of Iraq.

== Governorship of Basra ==
Samura was one of a number of Muhammad's companions in Basra chosen by the city's new governor, Ziyad ibn Abihi, to join his administration, following his appointment to the post by the Umayyad caliph Mu'awiya I in 665. When Ziyad's governorship was expanded to include Kufa, the other main Iraqi garrison town, and its dependencies, in 670, he appointed Samura as his deputy governor over Basra; Ziyad would govern from Basra six months and from Kufa for six months. The traditional Muslim sources attribute wide-scale executions of Kharijites and others suspected of holding Kharijite views in Basra to Samura. He may have led the funeral prayers for Sajah, the one time self-proclaimed prophetess who opposed Medina during the Ridda wars before submitting to Islam and settling in Basra. Samura remained in office at the time of Ziyad's death in August/September 673 and was kept in the post by Mu'awiya for six or eighteen months afterward. He was replaced by Abd Allah ibn Amr ibn Ghaylan.

== Death and descendants ==
Samura died in AH 58 or 59 (677–679 CE). His death in Basra was attributed to a severe frost by the 9th-century historian Umar ibn Shabba. His kunya was Abu Sa'd or Abu Sulayman. Like his father, Samura's son Sa'd or Sa'id also transmitted hadith. His daughter Umm Thabit was wed to Mukhtar al-Thaqafi, who took over Kufa and ruled in the name of Caliph Ali's family during the Second Muslim Civil War (680–692). Samura's great-grandson Abu Ishaq Ibrahim ibn Habib ibn Sulayman (d. 777) was a prominent astronomer and the first Muslim to construct an astrolabe.

== Hadith transmission ==
Samura was a prominent transmitter of hadith (traditions and sayings of Muhammad). He transmitted via Caliph Ali (r. 656–661), a cousin and son-in-law of Muhammad, to the prominent Basran scholar al-Hasan al-Basri.

== Bibliography ==
- Caetani, Leone (1907). Annali dell'Islām, Volume 2, Part 2 (in Italian). Milan: Ulrico Hoepli.
- Dickinson, Eerik (2001). The Development of Early Sunnite Ḥadīth Criticism: The Taqdima of Ibn Abī Ḥātim Al- Rāzī (240/854-327/938). Leiden, Boston and Koln: Brill. ISBN 90-04-11805-5.
- Donner, Fred M. (1981). The Early Islamic Conquests. Princeton: Princeton University Press. ISBN 0-691-05327-8.
- Hitti, Philip Khuri (1916). The Origins of the Islamic State, Being a Translation from the Arabic, Accompanied with Annotations, Geographic and Historic Notes of the Kitâb Fitûh al-Buldân of al-Imâm Abu-l Abbâs Ahmad Ibn-Jâbir al-Balâdhuri, Volume 1. New York and London: Columbia University & Longman, Green & Co.
- Kohlberg, Etan; Amir-Moezzi, Mohamed Ali (2009). Revelation and Falsification: The Kitāb al-qirā'āt of Aḥmad b. Muḥammad al-Sayyārī. Leiden and Boston: Brill. ISBN 978-90-04-16782-7.
- Fishbein, Michael, ed. (1990). The History of al-Ṭabarī, Volume XXI: The Victory of the Marwānids, A.D. 685–693/A.H. 66–73. SUNY Series in Near Eastern Studies. Albany, New York: State University of New York Press. ISBN 978-0-7914-0221-4.
- Landau-Tasseron, Ella (2005). "Alliances in Islam". In Bernards, Monique; Nawas, John (eds.). Patronate And Patronage in Early And Classical Islam. Leiden and Boston: Brill. pp. 1–49. ISBN 90-04-14480-3.
- Lecker, Michael (2004). The Constitution of Medina. Princeton: Darwin Press. ISBN 0-87850-148-7.
- McDonald, M.V., ed. (1987). The History of al-Ṭabarī, Volume VII: The Foundation of the Community: Muḥammad at Madina, A.D. 622–626. SUNY Series in Near Eastern Studies. Albany, New York: State University of New York Press. ISBN 978-0-88706-344-2.
- Murgotten, Francis Clark (1924). The Origins of the Islamic State, Being a Translation from the Arabic, Accompanied with Annotations, Geographic and Historic Notes of the Kitâb Fitûh al-Buldân of al-Imâm Abu-l Abbâs Ahmad Ibn-Jâbir al-Balâdhuri, Part 2. New York and London: Columbia University & Longman, Green & Co.
- Morony, Michael G., ed. (1987). The History of al-Ṭabarī, Volume XVIII: Between Civil Wars: The Caliphate of Muʿāwiyah, 661–680 A.D./A.H. 40–60. SUNY Series in Near Eastern Studies. Albany, New York: State University of New York Press. ISBN 978-0-87395-933-9.
- Nyazee, Imran Ahsan Khan (2005). The Book of Revenue: Kitāb al-Amwāl Abu ʿUbayd al-Qāsim ibn Sallām. Reading: Garnet Publishing. ISBN 1-85964-159-8.
- Rosenfeld, Boris (1997). "Al-Fazārī". In Helaine Selin (ed.). Encyclopaedia of the History of Science, Technology, and Medicine in Non-Western Cultures. Dordrecht, Boston and London: Kluwer Academic Publishers. p. 331. ISBN 9780792340669.
- Rosenthal, Franz, ed. (1989). The History of al-Ṭabarī, Volume I: General Introduction and from the Creation to the Flood. SUNY Series in Near Eastern Studies. Albany, New York: State University of New York Press. ISBN 978-0-88706-562-0.
