= Tribes of Arabia =

Tribes originating in the Arabian Peninsula

Map of the Arabian Peninsula in 600 AD, showing the various Arab tribes and their areas of settlement. The Lakhmids (yellow) formed an Arab monarchy as clients of the Sasanian Empire, while the Ghassanids (red) formed an Arab monarchy as clients of the Roman Empire.

The tribes of Arabia (Arabic: القبائل العربية) have inhabited the Arabian Peninsula for thousands of years and traditionally trace their ancestry to one of two mythic forefathers of Arab ancestry: Adnan, whose descendants originate from West Arabia, North Arabia, East Arabia, and Central Arabia; or Qahtan, whose descendants originate from South Arabia. Further, it is held in Islamic religion that the Arab people are descended from Abraham through his son Ishmael.

From the 7th century onward, concurrent with the spread of Islam, many of these tribes' members began migrating and settling in the various regions that were subdued during the early Muslim conquests, including the Levant, Mesopotamia, Egypt, Khuzestan, the Maghreb, and Sudan. This phenomenon triggered a process of Arabization that significantly influenced demographic shifts across most of West Asia and North Africa, culminating in the growth of the Arab population far beyond the Arabian Peninsula.

Today, these regions collectively constitute what is known as the Arab world, excluding Khuzestan, which, although home to a considerable Arab minority, is part of the Iranian world. The Arab tribes' migrations played a vital role in ethnically, culturally, linguistically, and genetically Arabizing these regions' populations.

== Genealogical tradition ==
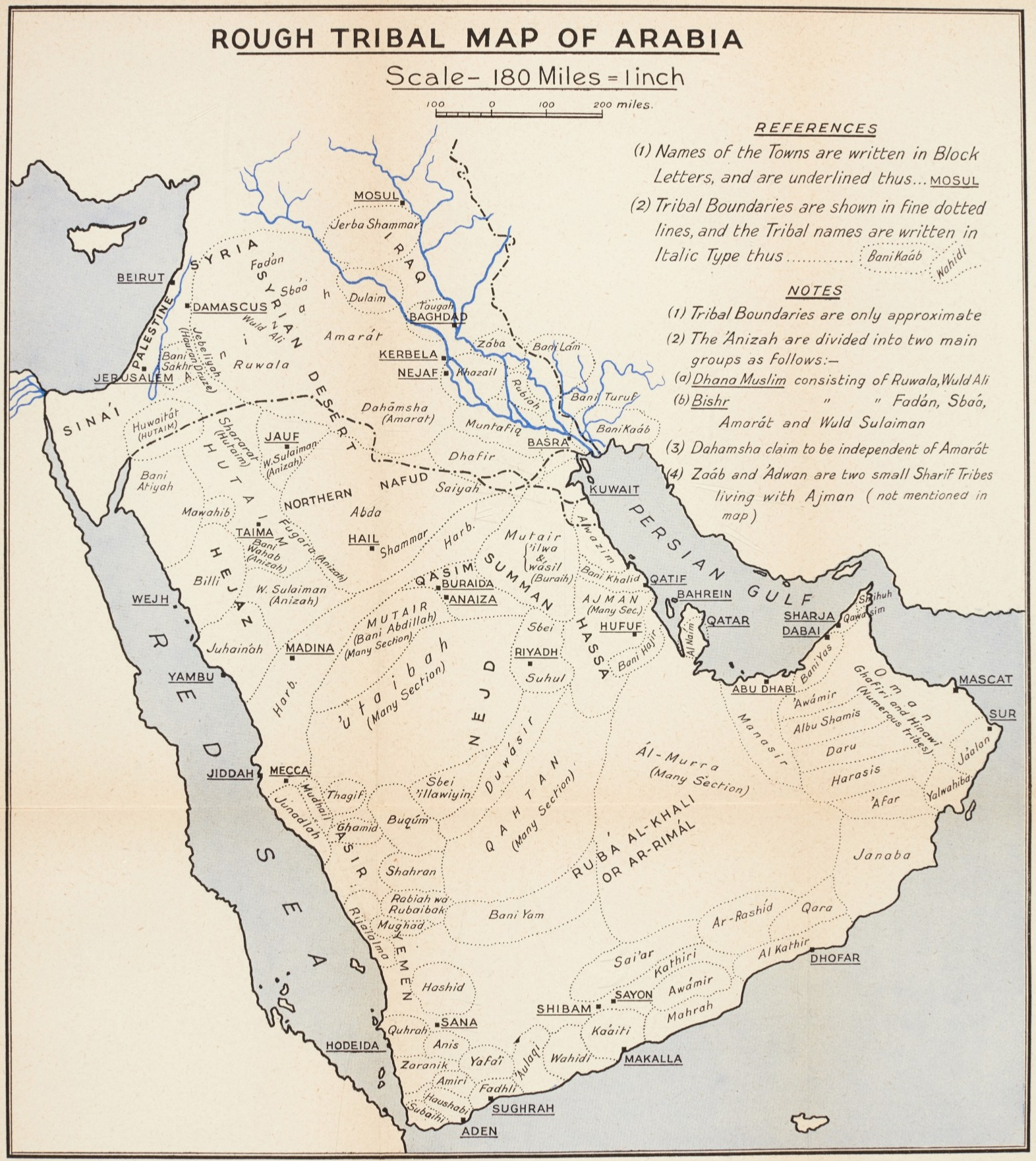
A map published by the British academic Harold Dixon during World War I, showing the presence of the Arab tribes in West Asia, 1914

The general consensus among 14th-century Arab genealogists is that Arabs are of three kinds:

- Al-Arab al-Ba'ida (Arabic: العرب البائدة), "The Extinct Arabs", were an ancient group of tribes in pre-Islamic Arabia that included the ‘Ād, the Thamud, the Tasm and the Jadis, thelaq (who included branches of Banu al-Samayda), and others. The Jadis and the Tasm are said to have been exterminated by genocide. The Quran says that the disappearance of the 'Ad and Thamud came about due to their decadence. Recent archaeological excavations have uncovered inscriptions that reference 'Iram, once a major city of the 'Aad.
- Al-Arab al-Ariba (Arabic: العرب العاربة), "The Pure Arabs", came from Qahtanite Arabs.
- Al-Arab al-Mustarabah (Arabic: العرب المستعربة), “The Arabized Arabs”, also known as the Adnanite Arabs, were the progeny of Ismail, the firstborn son of the patriarch Abraham.

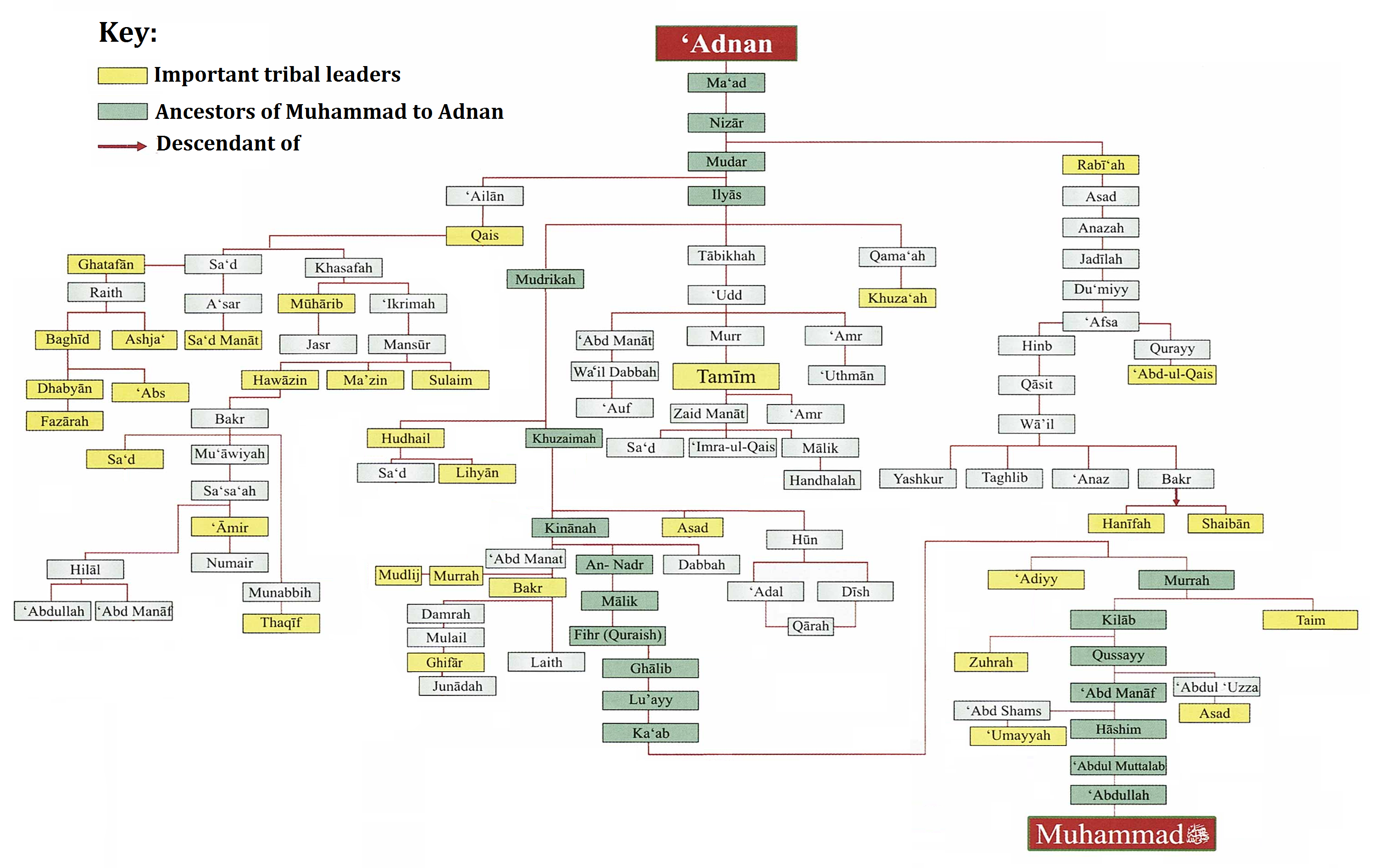
A family tree of the Adnanites, depicting the ancestors of Muhammad back to the traditional patriarch Adnan.

The Hawazin tribe and the Quraysh tribe are considered ‘Adnani Arabs. Much of the lineage provided before Ma'ad relies on biblical genealogy, so questions persist concerning the accuracy of this segment of Adnanite Arab genealogy. Adnanites are believed to be the descendants of Ishmael through Adnan but the traditional Adnanite lineage does not match the biblical line exactly. According to Arab tradition, the Adnanites are called Arabised because it is believed that Ishmael spoke Aramaic and Egyptian then learnt Arabic from a Qahtanite Yemeni woman that he married. Therefore, the Adnanites are descendants of Abraham. Modern historiography "unveiled the lack of inner coherence of this genealogical system and demonstrated that it finds insufficient matching evidence".

== Pre-Islamic history ==
=== Earliest known activity ===
The tribes of Arabia were engaged in nomadic herding and agriculture by around 6000 BCE. By about 1200 BCE, a complex network of settlements and camps was established. Kingdoms in the southern region of Arabia began to form and flourish. The earliest Arab tribes emerged from Bedouins. A major source of income for these people was the taxation of caravans, as well as tributes collected from non-Bedouin settlements. They also earned income by transporting goods and people in caravans pulled by domesticated camels across the desert. Scarcity of water and of permanent pastoral land required them to move constantly.

=== Identities, settlements, and languages ===
The Nabataeans and Qedarites were Arabian tribes on the edges of the fertile Crescent who expanded to Northern Arabia from the southern Levant establishing Arab cities like Hegra in Saudi Arabia. Their inscriptions were predominantly in Aramaic, but it is assumed their native spoken language was a variant of Old Arabic, one of many Ancient North Arabian languages, which is attested in inscriptions as early as the 1st century, the same period in which the Nabataean alphabet slowly evolved into the Arabic script by the 6th century. This is attested by Safaitic inscriptions (beginning in the 1st century BCE) and the many Arabic personal names in other Nabataean inscriptions. From about the 2nd century BCE, a few inscriptions from Qaryat al-Faw reveal a dialect no longer considered proto-Arabic, but pre-classical Arabic. Five Syriac inscriptions mentioning Arabs have been found at Sumatar Harabesi, one of which dates to the 2nd century CE.

The Ghassanids, Lakhmids and Kindites were the later reformations of already existing Arab peoples in the region. The Ghassanids mainly settled in the Hauran region and spread to modern-day Lebanon, Israel, Palestine, and Jordan.

=== Interaction with Jewish tribes ===
Around the 4th century CE, there developed a dominant Jewish presence in pre-Islamic Arabia, with many Jewish clans and tribes settling around the Red Sea coast. At the mid to the end of the fourth century, the Himyarite Kingdom adopted Judaism, thus spreading it in the region even further. The German Orientalist Ferdinand Wüstenfeld believed that the Jews established a state in northern Hejaz. The Quran details early encounters between early Muslim tribes and Jewish tribes in major cities in western Arabia, with some clans like Banu Qurayza and Banu Nadir being described as having a seat of power in the region.

== Rise of Islam and the Arab conquests ==
Following the early Muslim conquests in the 7th and 8th centuries, the tribes of Arabia begun migrating beyond the Arabian Peninsula in large numbers into different lands and regions across the Middle East and North Africa.

=== West Asia ===
==== Migrations into the Levant ====
On the eve of the Rashidun Caliphate's conquest of the Levant, 634 AD, Syria's population mainly spoke Aramaic; Greek was the official language of administration. However Syria had a large Arabic speaking population prior to the conquests, and the Arabic speakers of Syria were greater in number than even the Arabs of the peninsula. Islamization of Syria began in the 7th century, and it took several centuries for Islam to spread the Arabs of the caliphate did not attempt to spread their religion in the early periods of the conquest, and formed an isolated aristocracy. The Arabs of the caliphate accommodated many new tribes in isolated areas to avoid conflict with the locals; caliph Uthman ordered his governor, Muawiyah I, to settle the new tribes away from the original population. Syrians who belonged to Monophysitic denominations welcomed the peninsular Arabs as liberators.

==== Migrations into Mesopotamia ====
The migration of Arab tribes to Mesopotamia began in the seventh century, and by the late 20th century constituted about three quarters of the population of Iraq. A large Arab migration to Mesopotamia followed the Muslim conquest of Mesopotamia in 634, which saw an increase in the culture and ideals of the Bedouins in the region. The second Arab tribal migration to northern Mesopotamia was in the 10th century when the Banu Numayr migrated there.

In the late 18th century, another major migration occurred when a large faction of the Shammar confederation under the Al Jarba family crossed the Euphrates into Upper Mesopotamia. The migration was influenced by the Shammar's rivalry with the Anizah confederation and by the expansion of the Wahhabi movement in central Arabia.

==== Migrations into Persia ====
After the Arab conquest of Persia in the 7th century, many Arab tribes settled in different parts of Iran, notably Khorasan and Ahwaz, it is the Arab tribes of Khuzestan that have retained their identity in language and culture to the present day while other Arabs especially in Khorasan were slowly Persianised. Khorasani Arabs were mainly contingent from Nejdi tribes such as Banu Tamim.

There was a great influx of Arab tribes into Khuzestan from the 16th to the 19th century, including the migration of the Banu Ka'b and Banu Lam from the Arabian desert. Tribalism is a significant characteristic of Arab population in Khuzestan.

Subsequent Arab migrations into Iran, primarily across the Gulf, involved movements of Arabs from eastern Saudi Arabia and other Gulf States into the Hormozgan and Fars provinces after the 16th century. These include Sunni Huwala and Achomi people, who consist of both fully Arab and mixed Arab-Persian families. The Arabs on the Iranian side of the Gulf tend to speak a dialect much closer to Gulf Arabic opposed to the Khuzestani Arabic which is closer to Iraqi Arabic.

=== North Africa ===
==== Migrations into Egypt ====
Map showing the territory seized during all stages of the Arab conquests, 622 AD to 750 AD

Ancient Bedouins and nomadic groups inhabited the Sinai Peninsula, located in Asia, ever since ancient times. Prior to the Muslim conquest of Egypt, Egypt was under Greek and Roman influence. Under the Umayyad Caliphate, Arabic became the official language in Egypt rather than Coptic or Greek. The caliphate also allowed the migration of Arab tribes to Egypt. The Fatimid era was the peak of Bedouin Arab tribal migrations to Egypt.

==== Migrations into the Maghreb ====
The first wave of Arab immigration to the Maghreb began with the conquest of the Maghreb in the 7th century, with the migration of sedentary and nomadic Arabs to the Maghreb from the Arabian Peninsula. Arab tribes such as Banu Muzaina migrated, and the Arab Muslims in the region had more impact on the culture of the Maghreb than the region's conquerors before and after them. The major migration to the region by Arab tribes was in the 11th century when the tribes of Banu Hilal and Banu Sulaym, along with others, were sent by the Fatimids to defeat a Berber rebellion and then settle in the Maghreb. These tribes advanced in large numbers all the way to Morocco, contributing to a more extensive ethnic, genetic, cultural, and linguistic Arabization in the region. The Arab tribes of Maqil migrated to the Maghreb a century later and even immigrated southwards to Mauritania. Beni Hassan defeated both Berbers and Black Africans in the region, pushing them southwards to the Senegal river while the Arab tribes settled in Mauritania. The Arab descendants of the original Arabian settlers who continue to speak Arabic as a first language currently form the single largest population group in North Africa.

==== Migrations into Sudan ====
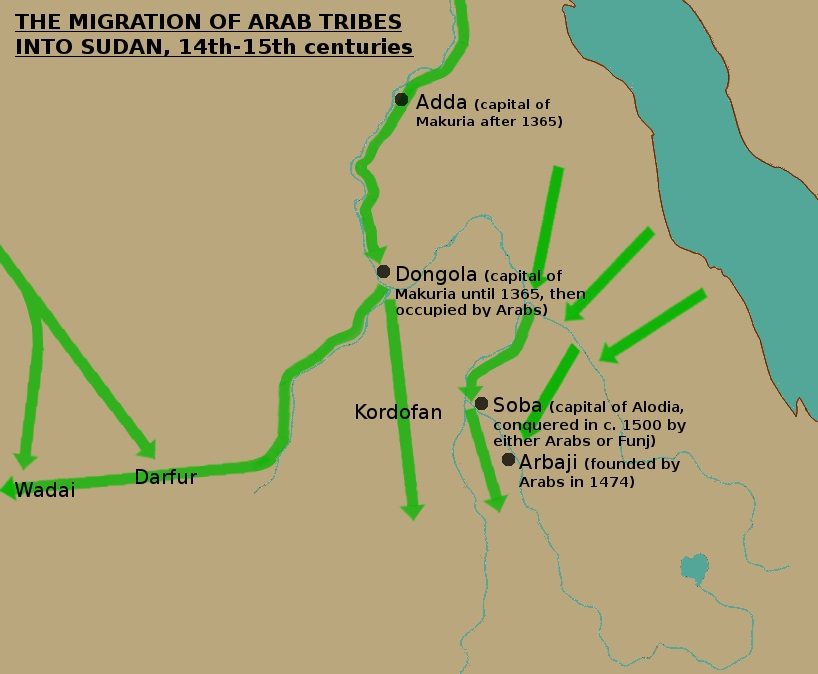
Migration of Arab tribes into Sudan, 14th–15th centuries AD

In the 12th century, the Arab Ja'alin tribe migrated into Nubia and Sudan and formerly occupied the country on both banks of the Nile from Khartoum to Abu Hamad. They trace their lineage to Abbas, uncle of the Islamic prophet Muhammad. They are of Arab origin, but now of mixed blood mostly with Nilo-Saharans and Nubians. Other Arab tribes migrated into Sudan in the 12th century and intermarried with the indigenous populations, forming the Sudanese Arabs. In 1846, many Arab Rashaida migrated from Hejaz in present-day Saudi Arabia into what is now Eritrea and north-east Sudan after tribal warfare had broken out in their homeland. The Rashaida of Sudan and Eritrea live in close proximity with the Beja people. Large numbers of Bani Rasheed are also found on the Arabian Peninsula. They are related to the Banu Abs tribe.

== The Great Skulls of Arabia ==
According to Arab traditions, tribes are divided into different divisions called Arab skulls (جماجم العرب), which is a term given to a group of tribes of the Arabian Peninsula, which are described in the traditional custom of strength, abundance, victory, and honor. A number of them branched out, which later became independent tribes (sub-tribes). They are called "Skulls" because it is thought that the skull is the most important part of the body, and the majority of Arab tribes are descended from these major tribes.

They are:

- Bakr, has descendants in Arabia and Iraq.
- Kinanah, has descendants in Arabia, Iraq, Egypt, Sudan, Palestine, Tunisia, Morocco, and Syria and Yemen.
- Hawazin, has descendants in Arabia, Libya, Algeria, Morocco, Sudan, and Iraq.
- Tamim, has descendants in Arabia, Iraq, Iran, Palestine, Algeria, and Morocco
- Azd, has descendants in Arabia, Iraq, Levant, and North Africa.
- Ghatafan, has descendants in Arabia and the Maghreb.
- Madhhij, has descendants in Arabia, Syria and Iraq.
- Abd al-Qays, has descendants in Arabia.
- Al Qays, has descendants in Arabia, Syria and Iraq.
- Quda'a, has descendants in Arabia, Syria, and North Africa.

== See also ==
- Tribes of Yemen
- Arab tribes of Iraq
- Arab tribes of Algeria
- Arabian tribes that interacted with Muhammad
