= Banu Amr =

Map of the Arabian Peninsula in 600 AD, showing the various Arab tribes and their areas of settlement. The Lakhmids (yellow) formed an Arab monarchy as clients of the Sasanian Empire, while the Ghassanids (red) formed an Arab monarchy as clients of the Roman Empire A map published by the British academic Harold Dixon during World War I, showing the presence of the Arab tribes in West Asia, 1914

Banu Amr bin Auf (Arabic: بنو عمرو بن عوف) are an Arabian tribe in Quba, on the outskirts of Medina. Umar and his companions stayed with them during the hijra from Mecca. Its descendants today consist of the Harb tribe.

== See also ==
- Arabian tribes that interacted with Muhammad
