= Extinct Arabs =

Tribes of Arabia with no surviving descendants

The Extinct Arabs (Arabic: عرب بائدة, al-Arab al-Ba'ida) or the Perished Arabs, are the tribes of Arabia that are no longer existent in today's world and have no surviving descendants. The origins and history of such tribes are obscure, although tales from them have been narrated by historians and scholars from later periods of time.

== Classification ==
The term "Extinct Arabs" are used for the Arabian tribes who do not have any living descendants left to this day. According to Safiur Rahman Mubarakpuri, the Extinct Arabs are the Arabian tribes with very little known of their history. The term "Perishing Arabs" is also used as a description for these tribes.

== List of extinct Arab tribes ==
- ʿĀd
- Thamud
- Tasm and Jadis
- Midianites
- Jurhum
- Ameem
- Ubayl
- Hadoura

The Amalekites are also considered to be among the Extinct Arabs.

== Reasons for extinction ==
=== 'Ad, Thamud and Midianites ===
The Qur'an mentions that the tribes of 'Ad, Thamud and the Midianites were destroyed by God as a punishment for not following the orders and advices of the messengers/prophets that were sent to each of them.

- ۝ Has not the story reached them of those before them? – The people of Nūḥ (Noah), ʿĀd and Thamud, the people of Ibrahim (Abraham), the dwellers [literally, comrades] of Madyan (Midian) and the cities overthrown [i.e. the people to whom Lūt (Lot) preached], to them came their Messengers with clear proofs. So it was not Allah who wronged them, but they used to wrong themselves.

=== Tasm and Jadis ===
According to Tabari, the Jadis tribe became extinct due to it being completely wiped out by the armies of the Himyarite Kingdom in the 6th century CE, as a retaliation for the assassination of the king of Tasm, who was an ally of Himyar. The adults of the Jadis were slaughtered, while the children were forced into slavery. Similar events were reported by Ibn Sa'id al-Maghribi.

=== Jurhum ===
The Jurhum tribe, who were ruling Mecca in ancient times, were eventually forced out of it in the 2nd century CE by the Banu Khuza'ah and the Banu Bakr ibn Abd Manat tribes, who were enraged at the Jurhum for profiting off the Kaaba.

== See also ==
- Qahtanites
- Adnanites
