= Banu al-Samayda =

Banu al-Samayda (Arabic: بنو السميدع) were an Arab tribe that flourished in Hauran, Syria in the second century AD. They had a role in the administration of the city of Dionysias-Soada.

== Archaeological evidence ==
During his travels in Syria in the 1850s, Josias Leslie Porter discovered an inscription in the city of As-Suwayda. It was found a short distance east of a mosque and dates to the consulate of Gaius Domitius Dexter. The exact year is debated and could be 183, 186, or 196 AD. The inscription reads: "To the good fortune of the Lord Caesar (M. Aurelius) Antoninus, after Domitius Dexter (was) Consul, Hetolipus from the Gepi from Gousarea, and Nathon Aphetathon (from the) Orsovi, prepared and constructed both the temple to Minerva in Gerrha, with the statues, (and) instituted overseers of the tribe (of the) Somaetheni". According to William Henry Waddington, the inscription attests to the existence of the Samayda (Somaetheni) tribe, long thought to be legendary.

The Somaetheni are also mentioned in an inscription from Vitrolles mentioning "Tubal" of Adra commander of the Somaetheni and Arrhus (chief) of Atta, armored cavalryman of the Somaetheni. The inscription is written in Greek and Tubal is written "Tubalos", and with the elimination of the Hellenizing ending, one is left with a recognizable Semitic name "Tubal" or "Tu-ba-lu".
