= Banu al-Harith =

Arabian tribe

Map of the Arabian Peninsula in 600 AD, showing the various Arab tribes and their areas of settlement. The Lakhmids (yellow) formed an Arab monarchy as clients of the Sasanian Empire, while the Ghassanids (red) formed an Arab monarchy as clients of the Roman Empire A map published by the British academic Harold Dixon during World War I, showing the presence of the Arab tribes in West Asia, 1914

The Banu al-Harith (Arabic: بَنُو الْحَارِث Banū al-Ḥārith or Arabic: بَنُو الْحُرَيْث Banū al-Ḥurayth) is an Arabian tribe which once governed the cities of Najran, Taif, and Al-Harith Governorate, its capital is the city of Al-Khubah, which is located on the outskirts of Najran, but is part of the Jizan region and Bisha, now located in southern Saudi Arabia.

== History ==
=== Origins and early history ===
The Banu Harith descend from the Qahtanite people, one of the most prominent Arab tribes originating from Yemen. The earliest recorded ancestor of the Qahtanites is Joktan, one of the two sons of Eber. The Qahtanite people are divided into the two factions, the Himyarite and Kahlani tribes. The Kahlani tribe can be further broken into smaller sub-groups which include the Banu Harith which was established by Harith bin Ka'b. The Banu Harith converted to Judaism during pre-Islamic times. They wore a jambiya on their belt and worked primarily in goldsmithing and repairing arms.

The Banu Harith allied with Banu Madh'hij in order to launch an attack on Najran and they were able to successfully conquer the city. Banu Harith lived peacefully beside Banu Hamdan and they were the most powerful house which ruled Najran for many centuries. This was brought to an end during the Christian invasion. After the Christian conquest of Najran, a sub-clan of the tribe emigrated to the Dhank region of Oman while another emigrated south and founded the district of Bani Al Harith in Sanaa.

In 523, the Himyarite king Dhu Nuwas (Dunaan), who had converted to Judaism, massacred the Christians there.

=== After the rise of Islam ===
They were included in Point 31 of the Constitution of Medina and honored as allies to the Muslims, being as "one nation", but retaining their Jewish religion. They were given the same rights as Banu Awf and entered into mutual protection pacts with the Muslim tribes.

The small remnants of Banu Harith continued to live semi-autonomously in the border city of Najran until the 1930s. As a result of the Saudi–Yemeni War the Saudis had conquered Najran in 1934. Persecution increased and the governor, Amir Turki bin Mahdi, compelled the Najrani Jews a single day to either evacuate or to convert to Islam. The Banu Harith fled south to Sanaa and Aden. Their descendants currently make up a very small component of the Yemenite Jewish population which now mostly reside in Israel today.

=== Notable people ===
- Harith bin Ka'b, also known as Arethas of Najran, a warrior and the founder of the Banu Harith.
- Dus ibn Milhan, a man who appealed to Dhu Nuwas after two of his sons were brutally murdered by the Christians who had captured Najran. After hearing of his plight, Dhu Nuwas swore to avenge the deaths and to liberate Jews of Najran.
- Thebith ben Chorath, a 12th-century astrologist and mathematician.

== See also ==
- Chorath
- Bani Al Harith District, a Mikhlaf that was founded by a sub-clan of Banu al-Harith
