= Banu Shutayba =

Jewish tribe of Arabia

Map of the Arabian Peninsula in 600 AD, showing the various Arab tribes and their areas of settlement. The Lakhmids (yellow) formed an Arab monarchy as clients of the Sasanian Empire, while the Ghassanids (red) formed an Arab monarchy as clients of the Roman Empire A map published by the British academic Harold Dixon during World War I, showing the presence of the Arab tribes in West Asia, 1914

The Banu Shutayba was one of the Jewish tribes of Arabia during Muhammad's era.

They were included in point thirty first of the Constitution of Medina as allies to the Muslims, being as "one nation", but retaining their Jewish religion.
