= Kinana =

Arab tribe based around Mecca, Arabia

Kināna بَنُو كِنَاَنَة
- Arab tribe
- Banner of the Kinana at Battle of Siffin (657)
- Nisba: Al-Kinānī الْكِنَانِيّ
- Location: Areas of Tihama and Hejaz around Mecca (5th century-present) Palestine (7th–12th centuries) Damietta and vicinity (12th–13th centuries)
- Descended from: Kinanah ibn Khuzaymah
- Branches: Nadr; Quraysh (counted as separate tribe); Malik; Milkan; Amir; Amr; Abd Manat; Bakr; Mudlij; Layth; Du'il; Damra; Ghifar; Harith; Jadhima
- Religion: Islam

Kinana (Arabic: كِنَاَنَة, romanized: Kināna) is an Arab tribe based around Mecca in the Tihama coastal area and the Hejaz mountains. The Quraysh of Mecca, the tribe of the Islamic prophet Muhammad, was an offshoot of the Kinana. A number of modern-day tribes throughout the Arab world trace their lineage to the tribe.

== Location ==
The traditional tribal territory of the Kinana extended from the part of the Tihama coastline near Mecca northeastward to the borders of the territory of their tribal relatives, the Banu Asad.

Map of the Arabian Peninsula in 600 AD, showing the various Arab tribes and their areas of settlement. The Lakhmids (yellow) formed an Arab monarchy as clients of the Sasanian Empire, while the Ghassanids (red) formed an Arab monarchy as clients of the Roman Empire A map published by the British academic Harold Dixon during World War I, showing the presence of the Arab tribes in West Asia, 1914

== History ==
=== Origins and branches ===
In the Arab genealogical tradition, the eponymous ancestor of the tribe was Kinana, a son of Khuzaymah ibn Mudrikah. The tribe traced its ancestry to Ishmael, who married a woman of the Yemenite Jurhum tribe and settled in the vicinity of Mecca according to Islamic tradition. The Kinana were polytheists, with their worship centering on the goddess al-Uzza. Islamic tradition holds that the Kinana and the other descendants of Ishmael gradually dispersed throughout northern Arabia, losing their original faith and falling into idolatry.

There were six principal branches of the tribe, namely the Nadr, Malik, Milkan, Amir, Amr and Abd Manat groups. The Nadr were the parent tribe of the Quraysh, the tribe of the Islamic prophet Muhammad which were counted independently of the Kinana. The Abd Manat included the particularly strong subgroup of Bakr ibn Abd Manat, whose main branches were the Mudlij, Du'il, Layth and Damra. The Ghifar subgroup belonged to the Damra or directly stemmed from Abd Manat. Another branch, the Harith ibn Abd Manat, formed the core of the Ahabish group, a collection of small, most likely unrelated, clans.

The ancestor of the Quraysh, Fihr ibn Malik ibn Nadr, emerged as the leader of the Kinana at unknown date in their victory against a branch of the Himyarites of South Arabia. His descendant, Qusayy ibn Kilab, was backed by the Kinana in his capture of the sanctuary town of Mecca, home to the Kaaba. Qusayy's position among the tribesmen was further bolstered by the support of the Kinani chief Ya'mar ibn Amr of the Layth group; the Bakr generally opposed Qusayy. The Fijar War was precipitated by the killing of a chief of the Banu Kilab by the Kinani al-Barrad ibn Qays, who was a man of the Damra exiled by his tribe but given protection by the Du'il and maintaining a confederate relationship with the Qurayshite chief Harb ibn Umayya. The Kilab and their Hawazin tribal kin moved against the Quraysh in retaliation, and the Kinana, including the Bakr, came to the Quraysh's backing. The Bakr remained hostile toward the Quraysh, and tensions were elevated when a chief of the Bakr was killed in revenge for the Kinani killing of a Qurayshite youth; tribal customs did not give youths equal status as chiefs.

=== Early Islamic period ===
Islamic historians did not note the actions of the Kinana as a united tribe in the time of Muhammad, though several of the tribe's offshoots, including the Quraysh, played pivotal roles in the formation and spread of Islam. The Quraysh initially opposed Muhammad and his monotheistic message, but due to previous tensions with the Bakr, were hesitant to move against him and his followers at Badr in 624 without guarantees of safety by the Kinana. The Mudlij group promised not to attack the Quraysh from the rear and they thus moved against Muhammad, who defeated them in that engagement. Later, an attack by the Bakr on Muhammad's allies, the Khuza'a, prompted Muhammad to launch his conquest of Mecca in 630. In this he received the backing of the Ghifar, Layth and Damra.

Following the conquest of Mecca, there is scant information about the Kinana. An important tribesman of the Du'il, Abu al-Aswad al-Du'ali, was counted as an ally of Caliph Ali, the cousin and son-in-law of Muhammad. The Kinana were one of the main components of the Arab tribal garrison of Jund Filastin (military district of Palestine) following its conquest by the Muslims in the 630s; the other main components were the Judham, Lakhm, Khuza'a, Khath'am and Azd. Caliph Umar (r. 634–644) appointed two men of the Kinana, Alqama ibn Mujazziz and Alqama ibn Hakim as dual governors of Palestine, with the former based in Jerusalem and the latter based likely in Lydda, around 638/639; the latter remained governor until being replaced by Mu'awiya ibn Abi Sufyan by Caliph Uthman (r. 644–656). The singing girl of the Umayyad caliph Yazid II (r. 720–724), Habbaba, mentioned the Kinana's presence in Palestine in verse:

A troop of the Kinana around me
In Palestine, swiftly mounting their steeds.

The Kinana were recorded to have maintained a presence, though weakened, around Mecca in 844/45.

=== Middle Islamic period ===
The emirs and fief-holders of the Kinana in southern Palestine left for Fatimid Egypt following the capture of the port town of Ascalon by the Crusaders in 1153. The Fatimid vizier Ṭalāʾīʿ ibn Ruzzīk resettled the tribesmen in Damietta and its environs, where they became known as the Kinaniyya.

Under the Ayyubids, the Kinaniyya were fiscally counted as second-tier troops, paid half of the rate of Kurdish, Turkish, and Turkmen soldiers, but significantly more than other Arab auxiliaries. The Kinani tribesmen fought with Qadi al-Fadil, a commander of the Ayyubid sultan Saladin, against the Crusaders at the Battle of Montgisard near Ramla, where Saladin's forces were routed. They were likely utilized due to their familiarity with the area around Ramla in southern Palestine.

In June 1249 the naval forces of Louis IX, about 700 ships' strong, landed in Damietta as part of the Seventh Crusade. The city's Kinani garrison, known by then for their bravery, fled at the sight of the Crusaders' arrival along with the Egyptian garrison led by Fakhr al-Din. The Ayyubid sultan as-Salih Ayyub consequently executed the commanders of the Kinani deserters.

== Bibliography ==
- Crone, Patricia (1980). Slaves on Horses: The Evolution of the Islamic Polity (1980 ed.). Cambridge: Cambridge University Press. ISBN 978-0521229616.
- Gil, Moshe (1997) [1983]. A History of Palestine, 634–1099. Translated by Ethel Broido. Cambridge: Cambridge University Press. ISBN 0-521-59984-9.
- Gibb, H. A. R. (1923). The Arab Conquests in Central Asia. London: The Royal Asiatic Society.
- Jayyusi, Salma Khadra (2010). Classical Arabic Stories: An Anthology. New York: Columbia University Press. ISBN 978-0-231-14922-8.
- Lane-Poole, Stanley (16 October 2013). A History of Egypt: In the Middle Ages. Routledge. ISBN 978-1-134-53734-1.
- Runciman, Steven (1951). The History of the Crusades Volume I: The First Crusade and the Foundation of the Kingdom of Jerusalem. Cambridge University Press.
- Watt, W. Montgomery (1986). "Kināna". In Bosworth, C. E.; van Donzel, E.; Lewis, B. & Pellat, Ch. (eds.). The Encyclopaedia of Islam, Second Edition. Volume V: Khe–Mahi. Leiden: E. J. Brill. p. 116. ISBN 978-90-04-07819-2.
