= Banu Bakr ibn Abd Manat =

Arab tribe from the Hijaz region

Bakr ibn 'Abd Manat بكر بن عبد مناة
- Adnanite Arabs
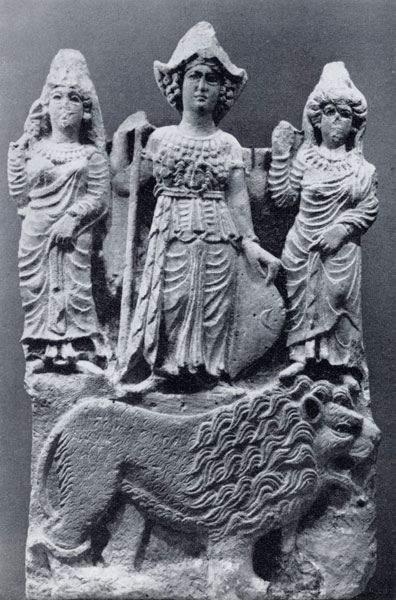
- The three goddesses of pre-Islamic Arabia; al-Lat, al-Uzza and Manat. 'Abd Manat means "servant of Manat."
- Ethnicity: Arab
- Nisba: Bakri
- Location: Hijaz
- Descended from: Bakr, son of 'Abd Manat, son of Kinana
- Religion: South Arabian polytheism (until 630 CE); Islam (currently)

Map of the Arabian Peninsula in 600 AD, showing the various Arab tribes and their areas of settlement. The Lakhmids (yellow) formed an Arab monarchy as clients of the Sasanian Empire, while the Ghassanids (red) formed an Arab monarchy as clients of the Roman Empire A map published by the British academic Harold Dixon during World War I, showing the presence of the Arab tribes in West Asia, 1914

Bakr ibn 'Abd Manat (Arabic: بكر بن عبد مناة) also known as Banu Bakr ibn 'Abd Manat or simply Banu Bakr is an Arab tribe located in the Hijaz region of the Arabian Peninsula. They are maternal cousins of the Quraysh tribal confederation and were rivals to them before the rise of Islam in the 7th century CE. Bakr ibn 'Abd Manat is also divided into four clans, all of which are now predominantly Muslim.

== Tribal Lineage ==
Bakr ibn 'Abd Manat is descended from Bakr, who is the son of 'Abd Manat, who in turn is the son of Kinana. The full lineage is as follows; Bakr ibn 'Abd Manat ibn Kinana ibn Khuzaymah ibn Mudrikah ibn Ilyas ibn Mudar ibn Nizar ibn Ma'ad ibn Adnan. Hence, they are an Adnanite tribe and also descended from the Mudar tribal group.

=== Clans ===
There are four clans of Bakr ibn 'Abd Manat:

- Banu Damrah
- Banu Du'il
- Banu Laith
- Banu Mudlij

== Relations with other tribes ==
=== Khuza'ah ===
Bakr ibn 'Abd Manat collaborated with the Banu Khuza'ah to expel the Jurhum tribe from Mecca after the Jurhum had started unfairly imposing taxes on the pilgrims at the Kaaba. In later years, however, the Bakr showed aggression against the Banu Khuza'ah who had become Muslims; this was one of the factors which led to the Conquest of Mecca which was led by the Islamic prophet Muhammad in 630 CE.

=== Quraysh ===
The Quraysh and Bakr ibn 'Abd Manat are maternal cousin tribes. They have had a few rivalries in the pre-Islamic period, such the conflict of Dhat Naqif which stemmed from the Bakr holding a grudge against the Quraysh due to the takeover of Mecca by Qusayy ibn Kilab.

== Religion ==
The Bakr ibn 'Abd Manat were followers of South Arabian polytheism. After the Conquest of Mecca, majority of the Bakr ibn 'Abd Manat converted to Islam. Notable early Muslims from the Bakr include Abu Dharr al-Ghifari, one of the Sahaba and an early convert to Islam. Other Muslims include Abu Waqid al-Laithi, who was a Sahaba as well and also a narrator of Hadith.

== Present day ==
Descendants of Bakr ibn 'Abd Manat are still alive to this day, and they live not only in the Hijaz region of Arabia, but also in Jordan and Egypt.
