= Banu Awf =

Map of the Arabian Peninsula in 600 AD, showing the various Arab tribes and their areas of settlement. The Lakhmids (yellow) formed an Arab monarchy as clients of the Sasanian Empire, while the Ghassanids (red) formed an Arab monarchy as clients of the Roman Empire A map published by the British academic Harold Dixon during World War I, showing the presence of the Arab tribes in West Asia, 1914

The Banu Awf (Arabic: بنو عوف, Banu ‘Awf), today known as Al Aufy and various spellings such as Al Aufi, Al Oufi, Al Awfi, and Al Awfy (Arabic: العوفي) is an ancient Arab tribe with a significant historical influence in the Arabian Peninsula, particularly in Oman. The tribe is renowned for its diverse lineage and contributions to the sociopolitical and cultural landscape of the region. The tribe's symbol is the poisonous oleander, symbolising their resilient ability to survive and danger when provoked. The largest concentration of the Al Aufy tribe is in Oman, specifically in Wadi Bani Awf, an ancestral valley that holds cultural and historical importance and is today a popular tourism destination known for its rugged beauty and outdoor recreation opportunities.

== Origins and early history ==
The majority of the Banu Awf tribe initially adopted Judaism upon settling in the Jewish-ruled Tayma after following a regional pagan belief system. This adoption was a condition imposed by the local Jewish population. After adopting Judaism, the tribe moved to Yathrib (modern-day Medina). The Banu Awf tribe was included in the Constitution of Medina, becoming allies of the Islamic Prophet Muhammad while maintaining their Jewish faith. By this time, some had already converted to Islam and through tribal and political relations the tribe were considered Muslims (one community with the Believers), though not all yet Mumins. This agreement exemplified the early coexistence and mutual support between different religious communities in Medina.

During the 7th century, the Banu Awf largely converted to Islam from Judaism, Christianity, and Paganism. Towards the end of the century, many had adopted Ibadhi Islam, like most Omanis, which emphasizes egalitarian principles and the election of leaders based on piety and knowledge rather than lineage.

Before and after the arrival of Islam, members of the tribe were involved in various occupations, including farming, trading, beekeeping, and animal husbandry.

== Notable historical events ==
The Al Aufy tribe has been involved in many major conflicts, serving as military commanders since the 7th century, and fighting in the wars during the Buyid Dynasty, the Seljuk Empire, the Nabhani dynasty, the Persian Empire, the Portuguese Empire, the Ottoman Empire, the Yarubid Imamate, and under the Al Said Dynasty. Members have also served in World War I and World War II, the Omani civil wars.

The tribe and its territories fell under various kingdoms, imamates, dynasties, and empires over two thousand years but were treated with deference and caution by various rulers due to their martial reputation and the "Five Fingers" pact between the five warrior tribes of Izki. This pact ensured that an attack against one tribe would be considered an attack against all, a measure that contributed to regional stability until the 19th century when tribal unity was fractured following the assassination of Sheikh Omar bin Ali Al Aufy by a rival faction from the same tribe in a coup. His sons, Muhammad bin Omar and Ghariyb bin Omar, were split up and sent to Kenya and Zanzibar (respectively) to preserve the bloodline.

== Modern era and legacy ==
Today, members of the Al Aufy tribe hold senior positions in Oman’s government and armed forces, as well as leadership roles in science, social welfare, philanthropy, education, and business. The tribe also has a diaspora across the Arabian Peninsula and beyond. Its history spans a nomadic, pre-Islamic past, participation in the Islamic conquests, and involvement in modern Omani society.
