= Amr ibn Ma'adi Yakrib =

Arabian cavalry commander (died c. 642)

Amr ibn Maʻdīkarib
- عمرو بن معديكرب
- Born: 544 CE (uncertain); Zubaid, Mikhlaf 'Ans, Dhamar, Yemen
- Died: 642 CE; Nahavand, Iran / Qom, Iran (disputed)
- Relatives: Ma'dikarib ibn Abd Allah (father); Zubaid branch of Madh'hij (clan); Qahtanite (tribe)
- Military career
- Conflicts: Many pre-Islamic battles, raids, and personal combats; Ma'adi Karibs Raid on Hawazin; Yawm al-Mushaqqar; Aksumite–Persian wars; Sasanian reconquest of Yemen; Ridda Wars; Yemen insurrection; Muslim conquest of the Levant; Siege of Damascus (634); Capture of Al-Rastan; Siege of Emesa; Battle of the Yarmuk; Muslim conquest of Persia; Battle of al-Qadisiyyah; Battle of Jalula; Muslim conquest of Khorasan; Battle of Nahavand
- Other work: First chain narrator of Hadith; Arabic poetry
- Military career
- Allegiance: Madh'hij clan Medina; Rashidun Caliphate
- Branch: Rashidun army; Rashidun cavalry

Amr ibn Maʻdīkarib al-Zubaīdi al-Madḥ'hijī (Arabic: عمرو بن معديكرب الزبيدي المذحجي) (died 642 CE) was an Arabian cavalry commander of the Zubaid clan in Yemen, part of the Madhhij tribe confederation. Amr is considered a legendary warrior, battling against legendary figures like Amir ibn-Tufail, Antarah ibn-Shaddad and Durayd ibn-al-Simma.

Amr converted to Islam in the time of the Islamic prophet Muhammad, and became one of the two champions of the Rashidun Caliphate, the other being Tulayha. Both were said to have the strength of a thousand soldiers. Amr participated in the Battle of the Yarmuk and the Battle of al-Qadisiyyah against the elephants of the Sassanids. He also led the Rashidun in the Battle of Jalula, and served in the Muslim conquest of Khorasan. Amr was killed during the Battle of Nahavand in 642 CE.

Amr had several swords that became the subjects of certain legends of later Arabic poetry, particularly during the Abbasid caliphate, such as swords named Dhu al-Nun, al-Qalzam and ash-Shamsharah.

Arab tribes residing mainly in Iraq, particularly the sub-branches of Zubaid such as Jubur, Obaid and Al-Uqaydat, claim to be direct patrilineal descendants of Amr ibn Maʻdīkarib.

== Life before Islam ==
Greater Yemen or South Arabia, the historical region in which Amr's tribe, the Zubaidi, originated.

At the time of Muhammad, the Zubaidi clan of the Qahtanite tribal confederation had split into two groups, which were called Zubaid al-Kabir (Zubaid the greater) and Zubaid al-Asgar (Zubaid the lesser). The Zubaid al-Asgar traced their progeny from a sub branch of the Banu Asam clan. Amr hailed from the Zubaid al-Asgar subdivision, and his father, Maʻadī Yakrib ibn Abd Allah, was the clan chieftain. Amr is considered by modern historians to be born 75 years before the Hijri year. Amr had a sister named Rayhanah, and a brother named Abd, who was killed by a Yemenite Madhhij tribe which came from a different branch of the Zubaidi clan.

Classical sources state that Amr ibn Ma'adi Yakrib had lived long before the founding of Islam, as he met Abd al-Muttalib, grandfather of Muhammad. He also met Abraha, a famous Aksumite warlord who, according to a narrative from the Al-Fil chapter of the Quran, was destroyed by the hell birds sent by God during his invasion of Mecca. Amr was also able to point out several historical landmarks of early medieval Yemen, such as a fortress built by Abraha which was called al-Ma'in fortress.

Due to his skill in poetry, Amr once also served as a delegation of poets of Lakhmid king Al-Nu'man III ibn al-Mundhir.

=== Pre-Islamic battles ===
As Amr lived to a great age spanning from before the advent of Islam, he participated in many battles. His career of raids and battles that filled most of his pre-Islamic lifetime was recorded with varying levels of accountability. Yemeni Mu'tazilite scholar Nashwan ibn Sa'id Al-Hamiri has said that Amr ibn Ma'adi Yakrib reached mythical reputation in pre-Islamic or Jahiliyyah chronicles. As indicated from ancient poems, it was recorded that Amr had defeated and captured many pre-Islamic Arabian legendary warriors such as Amir ibn al-Tufail, the chieftain of the Amir ibn Sa'sa'ah tribe, Harith ibn Zalim al-Mari'i, Abbas ibn Mirdas, Antarah ibn Shaddad and Durayd ibn Summah al-Jashimi. Some legendary traditional stories also depicted Amr's extraordinary feat of encountering two lionesses and killing both in the same fight.

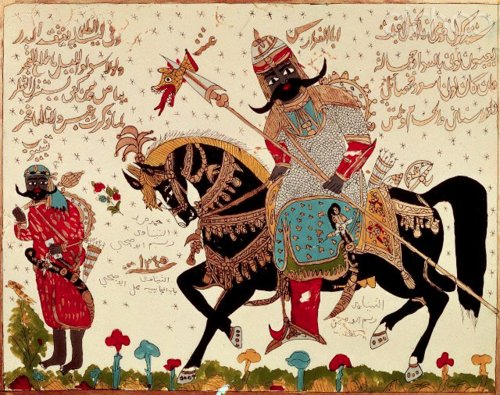
Antarah ibn Shaddad, long time nemesis of Amr in the pre-Islamic poetries.

The battle between Amr and Antarah was one of the most quoted poems since it was regarded as the clash between two of the best warrior poets of the era. Amr was said to have been the son of one of the rivals of Antarah. The duel between Antara and Amr, and its conclusion where Amr subdued his powerful enemy and later freed him were depicted in the poems recorded by Abu al-ʽAbbās Thaʽlab. The capture of Antarah happened during a battle which was called Ghazwat al-Tatlit. The duel was also recorded in the Al-ʿIqd al-Farīd.

Amr's duel with Durayd was also famous. Durayd was known as a hero from Hawazin, who had experienced more than a hundred battles during his life including the Fijar Wars, and lived for more than one hundred years, before being slain in the battle of Hunain against Muhammad. Abu Ubaydah Mu'ammar ibn Muthanna, a famous writer from Basra during the 8th century, described Amr, Antarah, and Durayd as three of the finest cavaliers of the ancient era. Amr first meet Durayd during a raid against Hawazin. When Durayd later raided the Zubaidi clan and captured Rayhana, Amr's sister, this prompted Amr and his clan to repeatedly attack Hawazin, until they defeated them and captured Durayd as prisoner.

The conflict between Amr and Amir ibn Tufayl is also described in several pre-Islamic Arabian poems. Amir ibn Tufayl married Rayhanah, sister of Amr, but their relationship fell apart when there was a quarrel between Amir and Amr, resulting in Amir defeating and capturing Amr. When Amr escaped, he rode to Amir ibn Sa'sa'ah settlement and challenged him to a duel. Amr disarmed Amir and dismounted him by grabbing his lance. This ended the battle, and Amir was brought to his home humiliated and with his hands tied.

Another notable conflict of Amr during his Jahiliyya era was against Abbas ibn Mirdas, a famous Arabian heroic figure from Banu Sulaym. Like Amr, Abbas also lived long enough to meet Muhammad and convert to Islam. During the era of Rashidun, Amr told caliph Umar that Abbas ibn Mirdas as-Sulami was a member of a group of six powerful Arab horsemen, and that Abbas was the best of the six. The story of their conflict was recorded in the book of Shia writer and genealogist Abu al-Faraj al-Isfahani in his book, Kitab al-Aghani.

Amr and Abbas both wrote taunting poetry describing the conflict between them. Both mention assaults from both sides, the casualties sustained in their battles, the raids, and the capturing of sheep flocks. Abbas' poem states that the conflict went for ninety-nine days. (Note: The historiographical narratives formed by the author were borrowed from the hostile banters of poetry battle between Amr and Abbas which implicated this conflict.) An account of this conflict by Abul Abbas Tha'alab describes how Amr captured Abbas by grabbing hold of his hair, before Amr later let Abbas go and pardoned him. Another pre-Islamic narrative recounts a conversation between Abbas and Amr ibn Tufail, where Amr is discussed.

Amr described to caliph Umar that the three bravest opponents he faced were:

1. A young warrior from a clan of Sha'bah named Harith ibn Sa'ad who had beaten Amr in duels three times in a row. Amr stated that Harith was so nimble in combat that he could jump off his horse to avoid Amr's strikes, and immediately appear from behind. Amr said to Umar that he felt humiliated by this defeats as Harith spared him each time, prompting Amr to befriend Harith as he respected the strength of the young warrior.
2. Rabia ibn Makdam al-Kinani, a famous warrior from Kinana and enemy of Durayd ibn al-Summa in the Fijar Wars. According to The Meadows of Gold by Al-Masudi, this conflict happened during a Zubaid clan raid against Kinana, where Amr and his clansmen managed to seize loot and Rabia's wife. Rabia then pursued the raiding force and confronted Amr. When Amr told this story to Umar, he said that he fought inconclusive duels against Rabia. As a result, Amr gave Rabia back his wife and the loot. (Note: Masudi said he compiled this story from older sources such as book of al-Akhbar al Zaman and al-Kitab al-Awsath.)
3. Amr's old rival who clashed with him numerous times, Amir ibn Tufail.

Aside from his famous poetry which was quoted by various historians, the Zubaidi were known as one of the Arab tribes which engaged in pre-Islamic tribal warfare. There are various accounts of Amr's lesser known adventures and battles, which were recorded in the form of oral traditions and poetry. As Amr had farms and a house in Tatlit, near Abha, in the modern Asir Region, adjacent to the settlement of the Khawlan clan, the majority of his conflicts and battles occurred in the far north of Yemen.

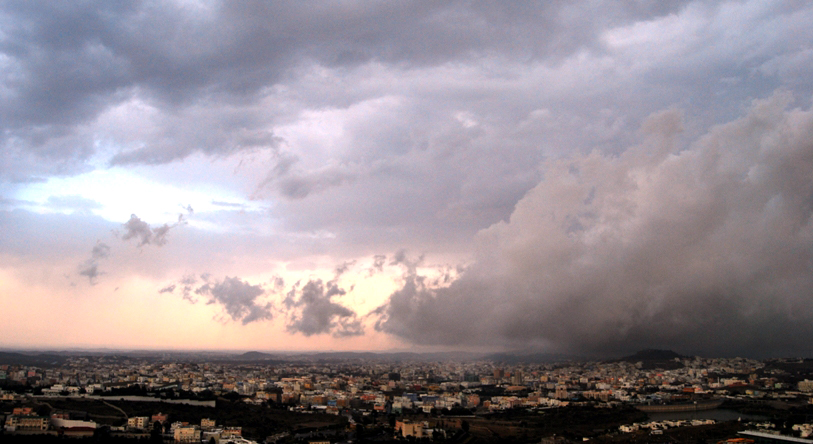
Modern picture of Abha, historically the hometown of Amr ibn Ma'dikarib.

==== List of Amr's other battles ====
- The first record of Amr participating in battle is during the battle between the Zubaid tribe and the Khath'am tribe, where at first the Khat'am prevailed, until Amr turned the tide of the battle, securing victory for the Zubaid. Amr gained his first renown from this battle.
- A battle against another Yemeni tribe, the Khawlan. Al-Hindani described based on the writings of Samir Al-Fursan Al-Yami; that Amr and his Zubaid clansmen launched a devastating raid against the Khawlan, killing scores, entered their fields and acquired massive spoils of sheep and gold. Amr then presented the spoils to his uncles, Sa'ad and Shihab.
- The Diwan of Imru' al-Qais stated that Amr and his brother Abdullah fought against Banu Mazin which resulted in victory for Amr, as they repelled the Mazin tribe.
- The invasion against the sub branch of Banu Hamdan, the clan of Banu Asid. This occurred after the Asid clan raided the Zubaidis and plundered many possessions, including equipment and horses belonging to Amr. Amr then was said to led his army in a war of vengeance, where he stated that he slaughtered thousands of Asheed clansmen.
- The battle against Banu Ziyad al-Harith ibn Ka'ab, where Amr reported that the women of Banu Ziyad were cheering during the battle. This battle was recorded by Yaqut al-Hamawi in his book Mu'ujam al-Buldan. Modern Yemeni historian Sulaiman Issa determined that Amr also fought with the clan of Bani Al-Harith bin Ka'b, who hailed from Madhij tribe confederat. They were led by Al-Sajf bin Qais bin Al-Ghaz, who had previously invaded Amr's homeland in Wadi Zubaid.
- The battle of "The Day of Bawar", a battle against Banu Sa'adi, a victory that gave Amr much pride.
- The battle of "The Day of Sa'adi", another battle against Banu Sa'adi which was also won by Amr and his Zubaid clan. Amr memorialised the battle through a poem.
- A raid by Amr against Banu Hamdan, which became the subject of the famous Hamdani poem, Hashash. Al-Asghar ibn Hashash al-Bakili ash-Shakri escaped the attack, and took refugee in a nearby settlement, where Hashash al-Ashgar composed a poem which described the attack of Amr against his tribe.
- Amr clashed with the Sa'adian clan led by Rabiah bin Sa'ad, entered the fortress of An'am that belonged to the Sa'ad clan, and destroyed it.
- The Zubaidi clan warrior and poet Qadi Abu al-Husain wrote an account of a raid under Amr's command against the Ghatafan tribe. During this raid, Qadi heard of a stranger who recited a poem about how none in his tribe could stand against Amr ibn Ma'adi Yakrib. This prompted Qadi to wonder whether he should pay warriors from other clans to stand against Amr and the Zubaids, so that they have someone to fight against.
- During the Rashidun Caliphate era, Amr recounted to caliph Umar that he had once faced a certain warrior who challenged him to a duel in a midst of battle, not knowing who he was. When he heard the name Amr ibn Ma'adi Yakarib, the enemy fell dead immediately from fear. Amr concluded by remarking that this man was among the most cowardly opponents he ever faced during his life.
- Amr's raid against Banu Nabhan, which was recounted in the divans or Saga of Antarah ibn Shaddad.
- A story which Amr told Umar about his revenge attack against a particular clan from the Kinda confederation, as the clan once raided the Madhhij clan of Amr and kidnapped some women of Madhhij. Amr immediately took his horse and rode alone towards the Kinda settlement, where Amr said he prevailed fighting against the whole of their clan warriors by himself.
- A raid against the Hawazin tribe, which was recounted in the Diwan of Amr ibn Ma'adi Yakrib compilation.
- The adventure of Amr in capturing several notable warriors such as Sinan bin Abi Haritha, Al-Harith bin Zalim, Hashim ibn Harmala, and Husayn ibn Harmala, which was followed by Amr's defeat and capture of an Arabian soldier named Khiyar ibn Murrah al-Marri. The Diwan narration recorded that this happened in Souk Okaz market after Amr performed the Hajj.
- A vague mention of the conflict between Amr's clan of Madhhij against a certain clan from the Qaysite tribe.
- Another account from the Sirat Antar (saga of Antarah), which was recorded by Ali ibn Zabid during the time of Abbasid Caliphate. It described that as Amr was in a marriage procession with a woman named Lamis, the procession was attacked by a figure named Urwah, who was in love with Lamis. However, Urwah was defeated and captured by Amr during the battle.
- A long narration of Amr's conflict with Urwah was continued with further sequences of another Amr's fight against a black skinned warrior named Sulaik ibn Silkah. Then, as Lamis worried about Amr fighting such a ferocious warrior, Lamis ran to Urwah and pleaded him to help Amr, which caused Sulaik to flee. Later, Antarah interceded in the incident, and decide to give Lamis to Urwah, who turned down Antarah's offer, as he thought that Lamis now preferred being in love with Amr. According to Peter Heath, Amr was under the mercy of Urwah ibn al-Ward, who has been urged by Antarah to kill Amr so as to take Lamis as his wife.
- There are some accounts of Amr admitting that he had lost in several skirmishes against a young hero named Rabia ibn Zayd, who rescued his sister from Amr.
- The conflict which involved Zubaid, Amr's clan, where they allied with the tribe of Jurm clan against a coalition of Banu al-Harith and Banu Nahdi tribal clans, with Amr himself commanding the Zubaid and Jurm coalition armies. However, the alliance between Zubaid and Jurm broke in the middle of the war, which caused the Zubaid to fight Jurm instead. Then as the two former allies fought each other, Amr led the victorious battle against the Jurm. Amr reportedly had captured several enemies on his personal effort.

==== Sassanid Yemen ====
There is mention of Amr's involvement in long dramatical events of the Aksumite–Persian wars. These occurred as the Yemeni Arab tribes coalitions resented the Axumite rule, which prompted the Yemeni to form a coalition through their leader, Sayf ibn Dhi Yazan, with the Sasanian Empire. According to Tabari, the undermanned Yemeni-Sasanian alliance won a "miraculous" victory, and expelled the Aksumites from the Arabian peninsula. After the death of Sayf during the second invasion of Aksumite, Amr was mentioned as one of the tribal chiefs who agreed to support the resistance against the Aksumite, and later agreed to fight under command of Badhan against the Aksumites, which successfully repulsed the Aksumites permanently. Yemen then Sasanian Yemen, a Sasanian protectorate region.

Following this, as the Yemeni Arabs in the Madhhij dwelling region grew discontent with the rule of Sassanids, because they are not willing to submit under a faction which they thought of as another foreign invader, they revolted. The revolts were spearheaded by the now united Madhhij Arabian tribes, where the first clash against the Sassanids occurred in the Madhab Valley in Al-Jawf, in Ramadan 2 AH / 622 CE, where Amr participated in this battle. The Madhhij suffered heavy losses, as many of their clan chieftains were felled, with the survivors of the battle including Amr and his nephew, Qays ibn Maksuh.

The Quraysh tribe, from which Muhammad hailed, hired Amr and Tulayha, another famed pre-Islamic knight hailed from Asad tribe, in some of their battles against opposing tribes, During Muhammad's life, Amr was said to be entangled in an affair which involved his long time rival Amir ibn Tufail, who had once captured Amr and married Amr's sister Raihanah. Amir ibn Tufail was captured by Untairah, a female warrior sister of prominent figure named Dhu al-Kalab. However, due to intercession from Amr, Untairah agreed to release Amir, who decided then to attack Muhammad, who was preaching Islam. It is said before he began his attack, Amir ibn Tufail died from a neck tumour, placed there due to the prayers of Muhammad against him.

== Life after Islamic conversion ==
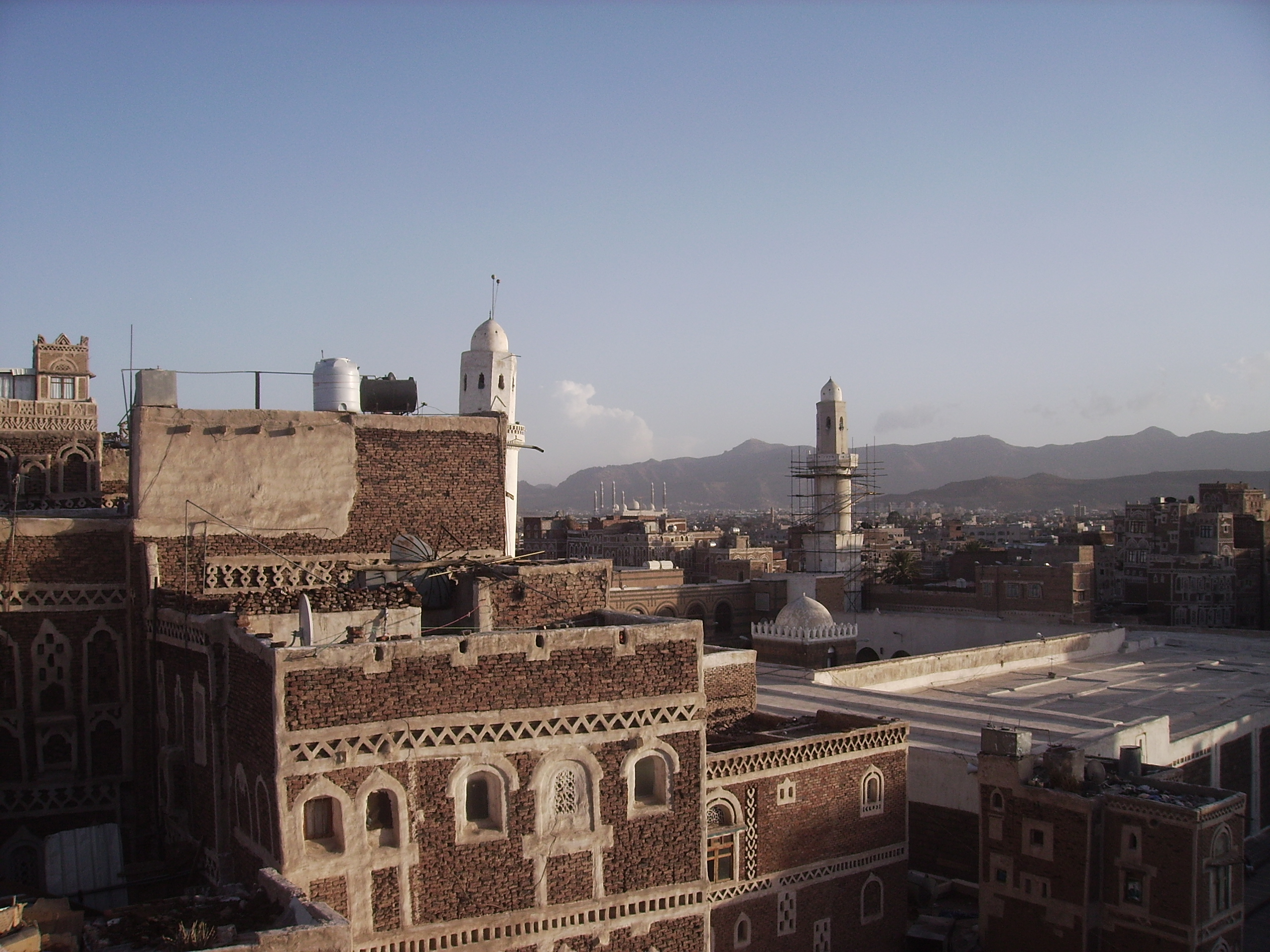
The Great Mosque of Sanaa, the oldest mosque in Yemen. It was built around 633 CE.

At the time when Muhammad began to preach about the Islamic faith, Amr heard about it and was compelled to meet Muhammad. Amr urged Qays ibn Maksuh to go with him to check whether Muhammad's claims to be a prophet were true, which Qays rejected. Then in turn, Amr went by himself to meet Muhammad, which impressed him and prompted him to convert to Islam as he meet Muhammad. Amr's sword, which was named al-Samsarah,(translated as "killing on the spot",) which was a sword of as-Sayf al-Qala'i type, was awarded to Khalid ibn Sa'id as Khalid was appointed as Muhammad's administrator in Yemen. This happened as Khalid ibn Sa'id was on his way to Yemen, when suddenly the tribesmen of Amr from Zubadi ambushed him. The ambushers were defeated and captured, then Amr gave his al-Samsara sword to Khalid as a guarantee to free them and allow them to accept Islam instead. Amr's sword was presumably originating from the Arabian-Indian sea trade, which according to Ali ibn al-Athir, had become the standard of Arab Muslim army weapons during the time of Muhammad. Other several famous swords of the same type were named Dhu al-Nun and al-Qalzam.

After Amr had met with Muhammad, he participated in the second Madhhij revolution against the Sassanid occupants, where several Madhhij who had converted to Islam including Amr, Qais ibn Maksuh, Qais ibn Al-Hussein, Yazid bin Abdul Madan, Yazid ibn Al-Mahjal, Yazid ibn Al-Afkal, and Yazid ibn Dhi Jarrah Al-Hamiri, were involved in this second attempt to retake their control of their lands from the Sassanid administrators. This time, Amr and the other Madhhij leaders managed to defeat the Sassanid force of Al-Abna' and expelled the Sassanid elements from the regions where clans of Madhhij dwelt. For the rest of Muhammad's life, Amr lived under Farwah ibn Musaik, a governor from tribe of Murad who were appointed by Muhammad to govern the Zakah and Sharia law of Yemen region.

Later, during the great Ridda Wars, Qays curtailed the forces of a Yemeni rebel leader who claimed himself as prophet, named Al-Aswad al-Ansi. However, both Amr and Qays later revolted against the caliphate of Abu Bakar as both did not agree with the new administrator appointed by the caliph, thus they seceded from leadership of Farwah, who acted as their regions governor at the time. Amr and Qays ibn Maksuh then conspired to kill three caliphate deputies in Yemen. Both Amr and Qays were rallied for the second insurrection in Yemen. However, both were defeated by the force of Ikrima ibn Abi Jahl. Amr and Qays were said to be captured by Fayruz al-Daylami. According to the record of Usd al-ghabah fi marifat al-Saḥabah, Amr came to Medina as a prisoner and was guarded by a caliphate soldier named Al-Muhajir ibn Abi Umayya. Amr was then brought to caliph Abu Bakar, who invited him to Islam again, which Amr agreed upon. Thus, Amr was pardoned by the caliph.

== Service under Rashidun caliphs ==
=== Muslim conquest of Levant ===
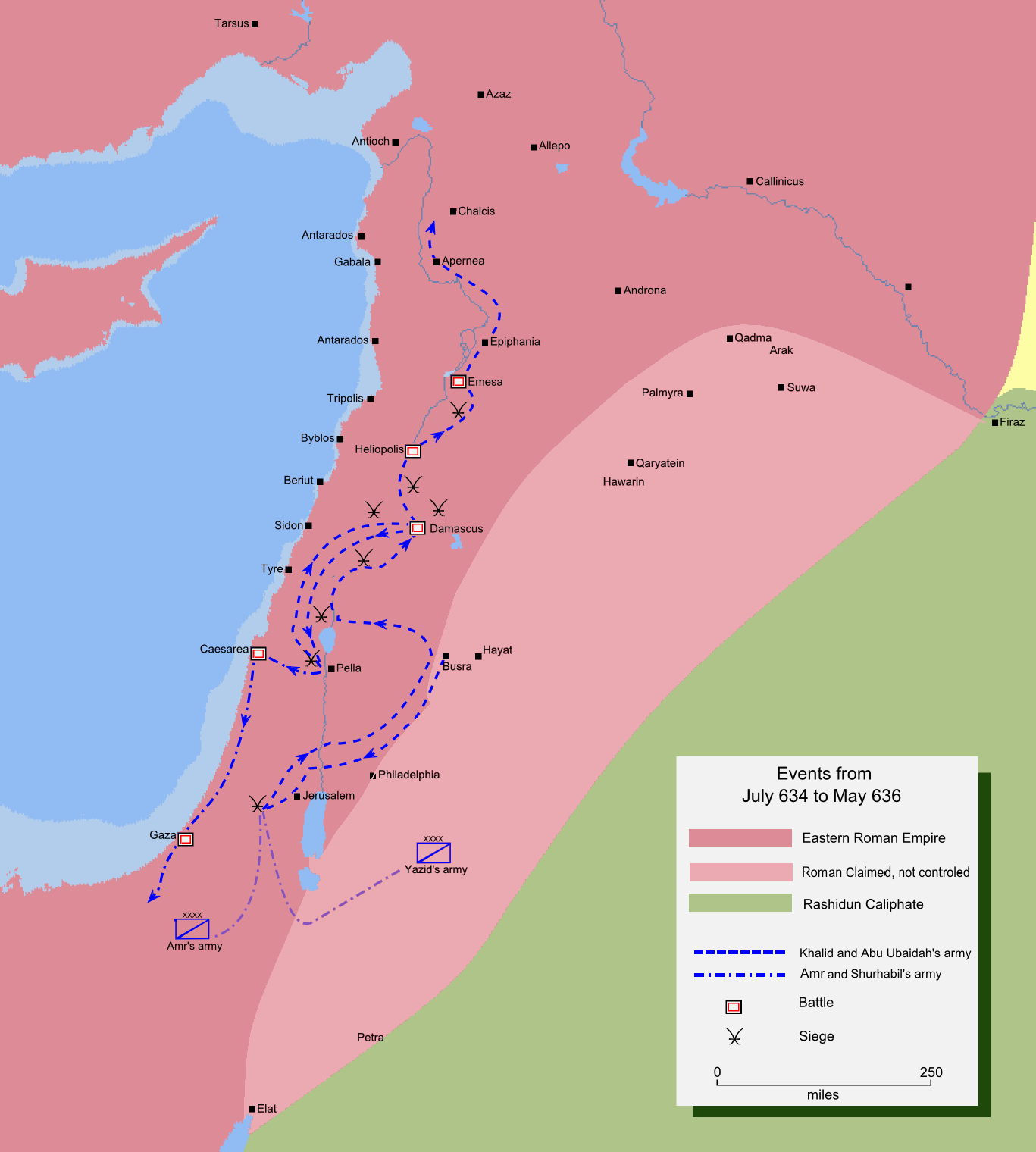
Map detailing the route of the Muslim invasion of central Syria.

According to Yemeni historian professor Sulaiman Issa, Amr brought along Zubaidi tribesmen from Tihamah to participate in the Muslim conquest of the Levant. In 634 CE, According to Hisham ibn al-Kalbi, after Khalid ibn Sa'id fell in the battle of Marj al-Saffar, the sword of al-Samsara previously belonging to Amr was found next to his body. Mu'awiya therefore took the sword.

Later, Amr participated in the Siege of Damascus, where his arrival alongside Abu Sufyan ibn Harb caused rejoicing amongst the Rashidun soldiers. At one point, Thomas, the garrison commander of Damascus, decided to lead the breakthrough against the siege by assembling forces in the eastern gate more numerous than the other gates, so that Khalid would be unable to move to Shurahbil's assistance and take command in that decisive sector. Thomas' attack at several gates also gave more flexibility to the operation: if success was achieved in any sector other than the gate of Thomas, such success could be exploited by sending troops to that sector to achieve the breakthrough. As the East Gate, the situation also became serious, for a larger Byzantine force had been assigned to this sector, and Rafay ibn Umayr was unable to withstand their attacks. Only the timely arrival of Khalid with his 400 veteran cavalry and his subsequent attack on the Roman flank, marked the turning point in the sally at the Eastern Gate. Amr and Khalid then positioned themselves on the front of the eastern gate of Damascus.

Later, Amr was involved in the Siege of Emesa in 636 CE along with Kindite tribe soldiers, where he marched to rendezvous with Abu Ubayda ibn al-Jarrah, who had recently pacified Jerusalem. At first, a Byzantine commander from Baalbek named Harbees was sent to Homs in response to the Muslims' siege of the city. Then, as Harbees led a sally in an attempt to break the encirclement, they immediately collided with patrolling troops of Rashidun led by Amr, Dhiraar ibn al-Azwar, Abd al-Rahman ibn Abi Bakr, Rabia ibn Amr, and Malik Al-Ashtar. The forces of Harbees were swiftly demolished by the Rashidun troops of Amr, which caused the city of Emesa to be captured quickly as there were no more adequate defenders left. Amr and Dhiraar then continued by leading more than 5,000 cavalry troops joining Maysarah ibn Masruq to besiege Homs.

Later, as the campaign in the Homs governate continued, Amr and about twenty mounted warriors consisted of Dhiraar ibn al-Azwar, Qais ibn Hubairah, Abd al-Rahman ibn Abi Bakr, Malik al-Ashtar, Auf ibn Salam, Sabr ibn kalkal, Mazin ibn Amr, Asid ibn Salamah, Rabia ibn Amr, Ikrimah bin Abi Jahl, and others entered the city of Al-Rastan. During the siege of al-Rastan, it is recorded that the supreme commander of Rashidun, Abu Ubaydah, employed military deception that allowed Amr and about 20 warriors to enter the city, and to cause chaos once they were inside of the wall while also opening the gate from inside and allowing the Muslim armies to overwhelm the defenders, thus allowing the city to be captured despite its very strong fortification defence.

=== Battle of Yarmuk ===
Later, Amr ibn Ma'adi-Yakrib was recorded as participating in the Battle of the Yarmuk, where Amr led soldiers from the Zubaid clan on the right flank of the Rashidun army. Amr fought bravely in Yarmuk as he once fought a groups of enemy soldiers whom he slayed one by one, causing the remaining soldiers to retreat until they stopped in one of the Byzantine encampments in the rear of the battle. (Note: Recorded in Maghazi book through the narration of Sahabah named Malik-Ullah al-Khathami.) However, Amr lost one of his eyes during this battle. (Note: Reported by firsthand witness through long narration fromAbu Bakr bin Abi Shaybah, Ibn A'id, Ibn Al-Sakan, Saif bin Amr Al-Tabarani and others with an authentic chain of narration on the authority of Qais bin Abi Hazim This narration chain also reported by Ibn Hajar al-Asqalani in Al-Isabah fi tamyiz al Sahabah) It is said that he lost one of his eyes due to smallpox.

There are record about his remarks regarding the Ghassanid tribe after the battle.

=== Muslim conquest of Persia ===
When the Battle of Yarmuk was over, Sa'd b. Abi Waqqas asked the caliph Umar ibn al-Khattab to send him reinforcements for the Battle of al-Qadisiyyah. Ibn Asakir recorded that according to Abu Ubayda ibn al-Jarrah, commander of Rashidun army in Levant, Amr was among nineteen veterans that participated in Yarmuk that were sent into Qadisiyyah. Umar took precautions after disaster befell the Rashidun army in the Battle of the Bridge, and he immediately instructed several commander to send their detachments to go to Qadisiyyah, where the Madhhij contingent sending 1,200 of their fighters led three leaders, which are Amr, Abu Suhra bin Dhu'ayb, and Yazid ibn al-Harith as-Sada'i. Amr was sent along with Tulayha and al-Qa'qa as commander to Qadisiyyah. Umar instructed Sa'd to consult Amr and Tulayha regarding military matters, as Umar highly regarded the wisdom of both of them, while in addition, Umar also addressed to Sa'd in his letter:

"I have sent you 2000 men: Amr bin Ma'adi Yakrib and Tulayhah al-Asadi. Each one of them counts as a thousand (soldiers strength)."

=== Battle of al-Qadisiyah ===
After arriving in Qadisiyyah, Sa'ad ibn Abi Waqqas, the supreme commander of Rashidun army in Iraq, and the Rashidun army in Iraq were rejoiced with the arrival of both Amr and Tulayha, as they were acknowledged by the Qurayshite as heroes who were often hired by the Quraysh tribe to fight their wars in the past, during the era of Pre-Islamic Arabia. Amr was then sent by Sa'ad as an envoy to Rostam to give the Sassanids a message, offering Rostam a choice between converting to Islam, surrender and paying Jizya tribute, or war. Abu Ubaidah testified in one narration that Amr had reached the age of one hundred and six years old while he attended al-Qadisiyah.

Later Sa'd ibn Abi Waqqas sent Amr, Tulayha, and group of Rashidun scouts through the enemy territory to gather information. After two days of journeying, the scouts spotted the vanguard of Rostam's army which they estimated to be numbered around 70,000. Tulayha and Ibn Ma'adi then sent the scouts to report their findings to Sa'ad, while Tulayha and Ibn Ma'adi continued to gather intel by themselves. Then, Tulayha and Ibn Ma'adi managed to trace the second and the third wave which they believed to be the centre and rear of the army, numbered 100,000 and 70,000 respectively. Amr urged to Tulayha to return as they had achieved their mission to spot the enemy army, but Tulayha said to wait for one more day, as Tulayha carried out a one-man raid during the night. Tulayha infiltrated inside the rear encampment where Rostam's tent was located. Tabari particularly detailed in one chain of narrations the circumstances in which Tulayha infiltrated the Sassanid camps under the cover of darkness, and cut the ropes of the Sassanid rear army tents while bringing torches to ignite the fires within the camp. Tulayha singlehandedly wrought havoc in their camps, killing two Sassanid soldiers, As the confused Sassanid army plunged into chaos, Tulayha stole two horses and then brought back one captive to Sa'd ibn Abi Waqqas (Note: Most Hadith scholars expressed their skepticism regarding historical narration of Sayf ibn Umar although non narrative historical informations of him was not criticized).

The horses, according to Tulayha himself, belonged to Rostam. As Tulayha return to Amr's location, where he had been waiting for Tulayha outside the camp, they both retreated with the stolen horses to report to Sa'ad about the number of enemy forces, which was around 240,000, completing the previous scouts report.

==== Four days of battles ====
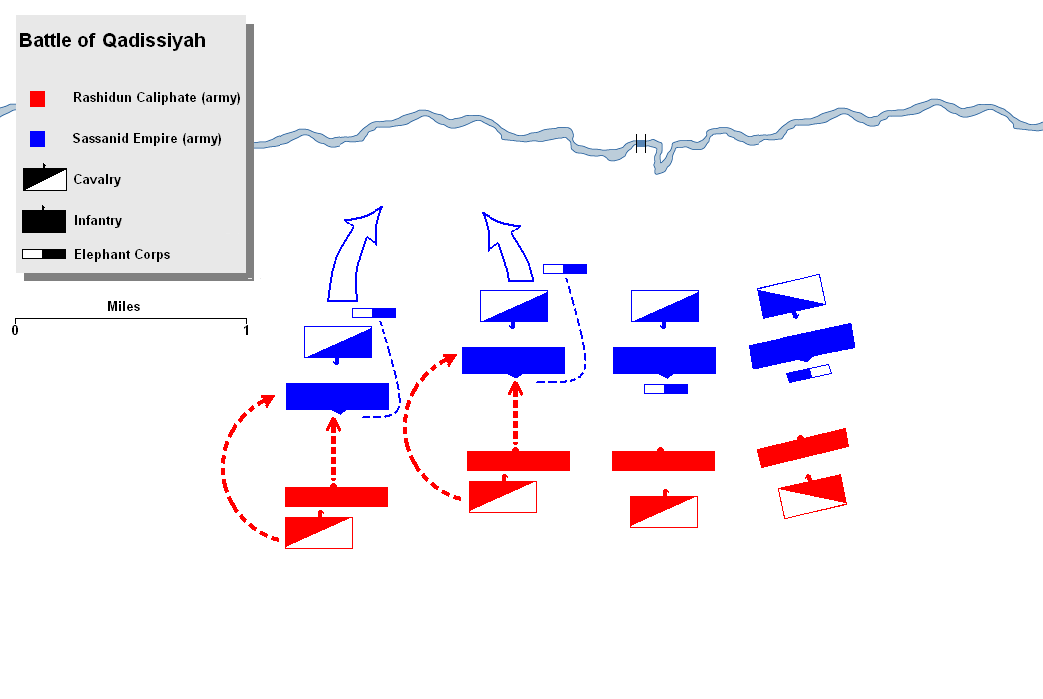
The Rashidun army managed to push Sassanid elephants on the second day.

Later, as the Battle of al-Qadisiyyah started, the Rashidun cavalry collided with the Sassanid cavalry. Then, as the intense battles were ongoing between Rashidun horsemen and Sassanid horsemen, suddenly one of the Sassanid champions challenged Amr to a duel or Mard o mard. Amr agreed and fought the Sassanid, only for Amr to seize his neck, slamming him to the ground and killing him. Amr remarked an insult that "the Persians were [stupid, like a] goat, once they drop their bows". On another occasion, as Amr roamed between the Rashidun and Sassanid lines on his horse, a Sassanid archer took position in the frontline and shot at Amr, which barely missed, hitting the edge of a bow slung on Amr's shoulder. Amr responded by rushing towards the Sassanid archer, dragging him down from his horse, seizing and breaking his neck, then slit his throat with his sword, and dragged the lifeless body of the Sassanid archer to the Muslim ranks and threw it in front of them, as a gesture to encourage the Muslims to fight harder like he did.

At the end of the first day, the elephants of Sassanid army left the battlefield due to Asim ibn Amr al-Tamimi's ploy, scaring away the alpha male of the elephant herd, which according to Tabari was identifiable by more brighter skin and being bigger than other elephants. The left flank of the Muslims also managed to stall the onslaught of Persian heavy cavalries.

Meanwhile, at the end of the second day, Bahman Jaduya, Sassanid right-flank commander, was killed by al-Qa'qa.

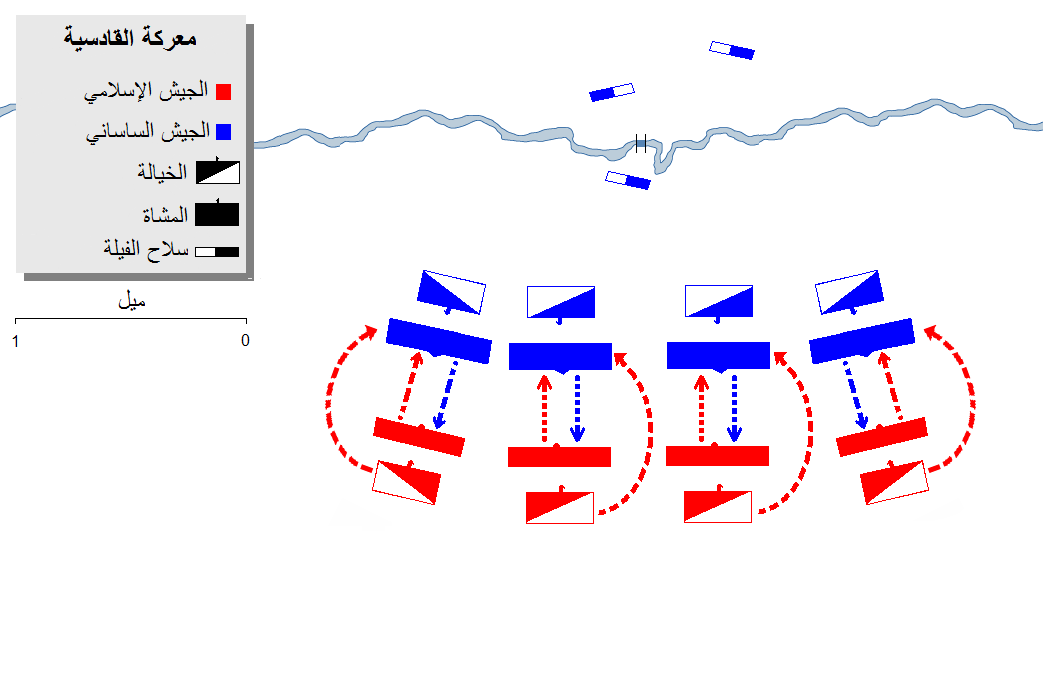
The elephant corps of Sassanid was permanently annihilated after Amr fought hard until beyond the bridge.

The third day of the battle, which was called the day of Imash, saw the Sassanid elephant corps rampaging towards the Rashidun ranks. Amr played an important role as he was one of the Muslim warriors who fought off the elephants' onslaught. Amr was the one who instructed the Rashidun soldiers to sever the trunks of the elephants, which was done so by the soldiers around him, stopped the elephants' advance. Historical narratives from poets recited during this battle revealed that Amr was the first to realize the elephants of Sassanid armies had paralyzed the horses of Rashidun, as the mounts were not used to being close with such animals. Then Amr charged along with Khalid ibn Urfuta, Jarir ibn Abdullah Al-Bajali, Al-Qaqa', Tulayha, Amr and Dhiraar ibn al-Khattab to turn and engage against the elephant corps, aiming their weapons to pierce the elephants' eyes, while also aiming to kill the elephant riders.

According to an eyewitness of the third day battle, Amr announced he would cross the bridge alone to confront the enemy, instructing his followers to join him after a brief interval. Then they found Amr is fighting fiercely deep inside the enemy ranks; surrounded by the Sassanid soldiers, while his horse was incapacitated by enemy arrows. At-Tartusi, author of Sirah al-Mulk, described how as forty to seventy elephants advanced towards the Muslims rank, Amr gathered himself and charged alone until he crossed the bridge which separated the Rashidun forces, where Amr fought alone surrounded by the enemy, as the Zubaid clan soldiers failed to follow and reach Amr. Regardless, when the Muslim soldiers managed to reach the encirclement of Amr, they found Amr was still alive and fighting alone inside the enemy ranks. The Muslim soldiers were amazed as they saw Amr grabbing and holding the hind legs of an enemy horse with his hands, keeping it in place with his great strength, while the Sassanid rider helplessly struggled while swinging his sword against Amr without success. Tthus the rider gave up his horse to Amr, fleeing on foot as the Rashidun soldiers reached Amr. When asked where his own horse was, Amr simply replied that his horse had died to enemy arrows.

The third day ended with the elephant corps of the Sassanid forces permanently neutralized due to combined efforts of Amr, Tulayha, Dhiraar ibn al-Azwar, al-Qa'qa, Khalid ibn Urfuta, and Jarir ibn Abdullah, while the commander of the elephant corps, Jalinus, was also slain. (Note: Another source were saying that Jalinus were slain by Tulayha in the fourth day.) Amr suffered many injuries, including a stab wound from enemy spear during this phase, although he was still standing with a sword in his hand.

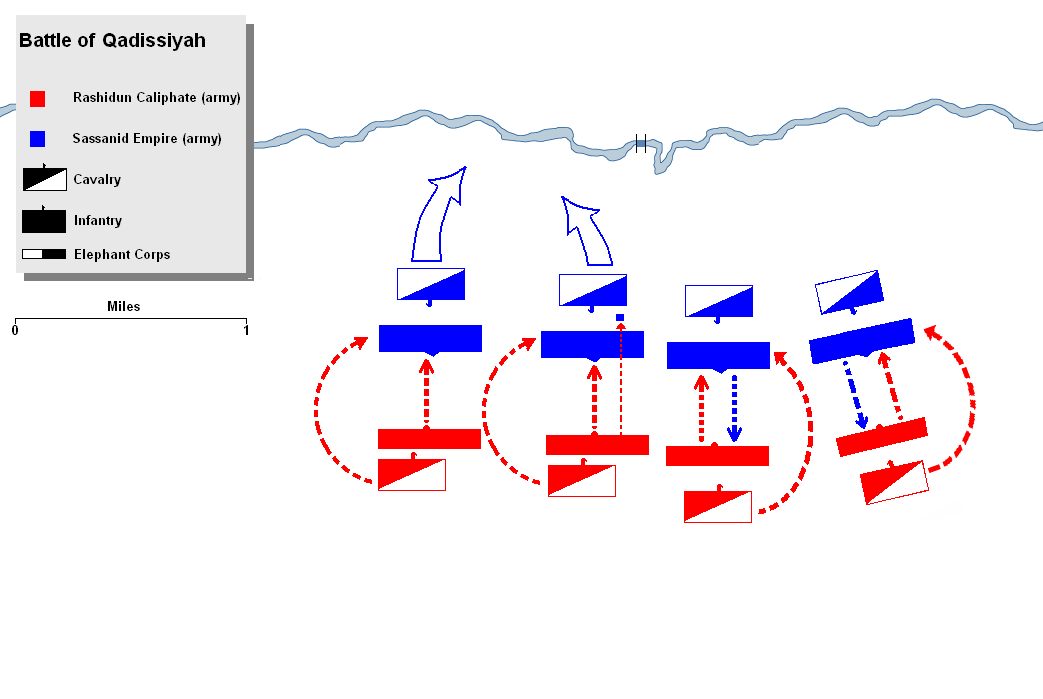
Al-Qa'qa's unit including Amr penetrated the Sassanid line and managed to slay Rustam on the final day.

During the fourth day of the battle of Qadisiyyah, Al-Qa`qa' devised a plan to end the fierce fighting against the Muslims and the Persians; he personally chose a group of some of the most valorous tribal chiefs from the Muslim army, such as Amr ibn Ma'adi Yakrib, Al-Ash'ath ibn Qays, and Ibn Dhul-Bardain, for this mission. As the battle started, al-Qa'qa then executed the plan leading this special units that included Amr on a daring charge to penetrate the surprised Sasanian lines. As the Sassanid soldiers did not expect this maneuver, al-Qa'qa and his units managed to reach the enemy commander, Rostam Farrokhzad. Amr managed to kill one of Rostam's escorts and seized his golden bracelets and brocaded coat, while later according to Tabari, Rostam was killed by Amr's comrade named Ullafah. At this stage, Ya'qubi had recorded, that Amr, along with Dhiraar ibn al-Azwar, Tulayha, and Kurt ibn Jammah al-Abdi discovered the corpse of Rostam, the highest commander of Sassanid army. (Note: There was a dispute among historians whether Hilal or Amr who has claimed the kill of Rostam, While Baladhuri giving the third version that it is Qays ibn Makshuh, Amr nephew, who killed Rostam.)

The death of Rostam shocked the entire Sassanid army, which prompted Sa'ad to instruct general assault to all the Muslim soldiers, and ended the four day-long battles which resulted the annihilation of Sassanid main forces mustered in Qadisiyyah. During this battle, the Rashidun army had lost one of their most celebrated hero named Abu Mihjan al-Thaqafi, whose death was witnessed by Amr.

According to Mohammed Hussein Heikal, Amr was rewarded a massive 2,000 Dirhams worth of spoils of war by Sa'ad for his astounding personal efforts in the battle of Qadisiyyah, although he did not earn bigger rewards, which were reserved for those who had memorized Qur'an, since Amr was not included as one of the Hafiz. According to the book of Abu al-Faraj as-Shi'i al-Isfahani, it is during this battle that Amr revealed the name of his sword, Dhu al-Nun, during his taunting poem towards the Sassanid army.

==== Battle of Jalula ====
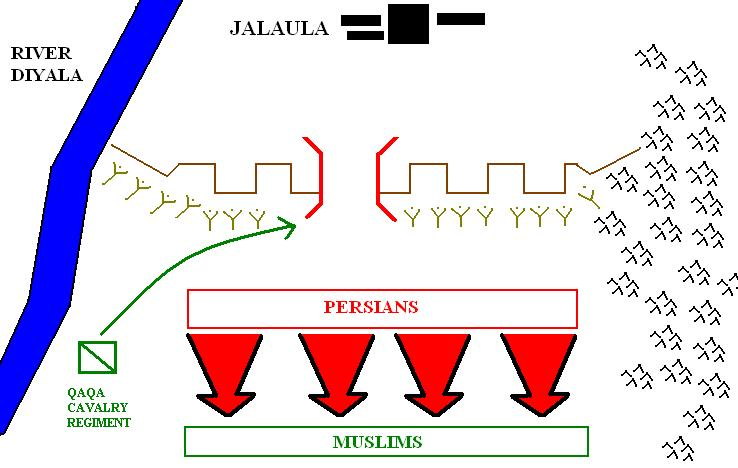
The cavalry units under Qa'qa and Amr captured the trench behind the Sassanid army.

Later, Amr participated in the Battle of Jalula, where he was reported to have played an important role during this battle along with al-Qa'qa, Tulayha, Hijr ibn 'Adi, and Qays ibn Maksuh. According to Baladhuri, Amr was appointed as commander of Rashidun cavalry during this battle. At night, Al-Qa'qa brought a number of elite cavalry to reach the door of the ditch. Among these horsemen were veterans such as Amr, Tulayha, Qays ibn Maksuh and Hijr ibn Adi, along with several horsemen from the Zubaydi clan.

According to a first-hand witness named Muhaffiz, al Qa'qa's units including Amr and the others managed to slip inside the trench between Jalula fortress and the still engaging Sassanid army, capturing the trench while the main army of Sassanid under command of Khurrazad was busy fighting the main Rashidun forces. This act caused panic among the Sassanids as they began retreating, while the Rashidun forces noticed that al-Qa'qa and his units had penetrated and taken position on the trench behind the Sassanid army. It is said the entire battlefield was strewn with corpses of the Sassanid army, thus the name of the area and this historical battlefield became "Jalula" (dead bodies scattered around). According to a report, as the Sassanid left their treasures and families within the barricaded trenches, when Amr and the cavalry of Rashidun managed to capture the trench, they found massive spoils in the form of numerous captives for enslave and about nine thousand horses, which were secured in the aftermath of the battle. One of the notable captives from this battle was the mother of Amr ibn Shurahil, a Tabi'un hadith scholar.

==== Further conquest of Persia & upper Mesopotamia ====
Map of Marw al-Rudh and Balkh which was captured by Ahnaf ibn Qais and Amr ibn Ma'dikarib.

Later, after the establishment of Kufa garrison city, Amr was among notable members of the Madhhij clan who settled in Kufa. During the tenure of Sa'd ibn Abi Waqqas as governor in Kufa, there were scandalous accusations regarding Sa'd's unjust rule in Iraq, to which Umar responded by sending his agents to check and interview the populace in Kufa. Sa'd himself was called to Medina for interrogation. When Amr was interviewed, Amr testified in defence of Sa'd against the complaints and accusation of the Sa'd duty in Kufa, as according to Amr, the rule of Sa'd was "...just in law, caring the poors, humble in nature, and fair when giving rewards...". During Mujashi ibn Mas'ud al-Sulami governance of Basra, Mujashi bestowed upon Amr an Asian sword of al-Qala'i, a slave who could cook bread, ten thousand Dirham, and a foal mare with preserved pedigree from an al-Ghabra horse (dust colored type of Arabian horse). It is noted by Cordoban writer Ibn ʿAbd Rabbih in his anthology, the Al-ʿIqd al-Farīd, that Mujashi belonged to Banu Sulaym, a tribe which was a mortal enemy of the Zubadi. The Sulaim had also engaged in many battles against Amr in the past. However, Mujashi did not bear ill will towards Amr, and instead recognized his bravery. Mujashi also provided Amr with shields, swords, and another warfare equipment.

Later, Amr continued to participate in further expansion towards Sassanid territory in Khorasan, where he was sent by Abdallah ibn Amir to serve under Ahnaf ibn Qais to expand and subdue the cities of Marw al-Rudh and Balkh. However, their advance was halted due to the onset of winter, which prompted Ahnaf to ask whether they should continue or not, to which Amr replied that it was up to Ahnaf. Ahnaf then decided they should return to Balkh and stay in that town instead.

Later, during the conquest by Iyad ibn Ghanm to the northern side of the Euphrates river, Amr was briefly mentioned by Waqidi as seeing action in this campaign. Amr was then assigned by Khalid ibn al-Walid to lead about 200 Rashidun cavalry to march towards Harran As Amr troops passed by Edessa, he forced the surrender of the city before they reached Harran, and the populace then surrendered peacefully.

Amr also wrote about the continuation of the conquests of Persian territory, which were under command of Rabi ibn Ziyad al-Harithi, that encompassed from Sawad, Fars province, until they managed to reach and capture the mountainous area of Makar.

==== Battle of Nahavand & Death ====
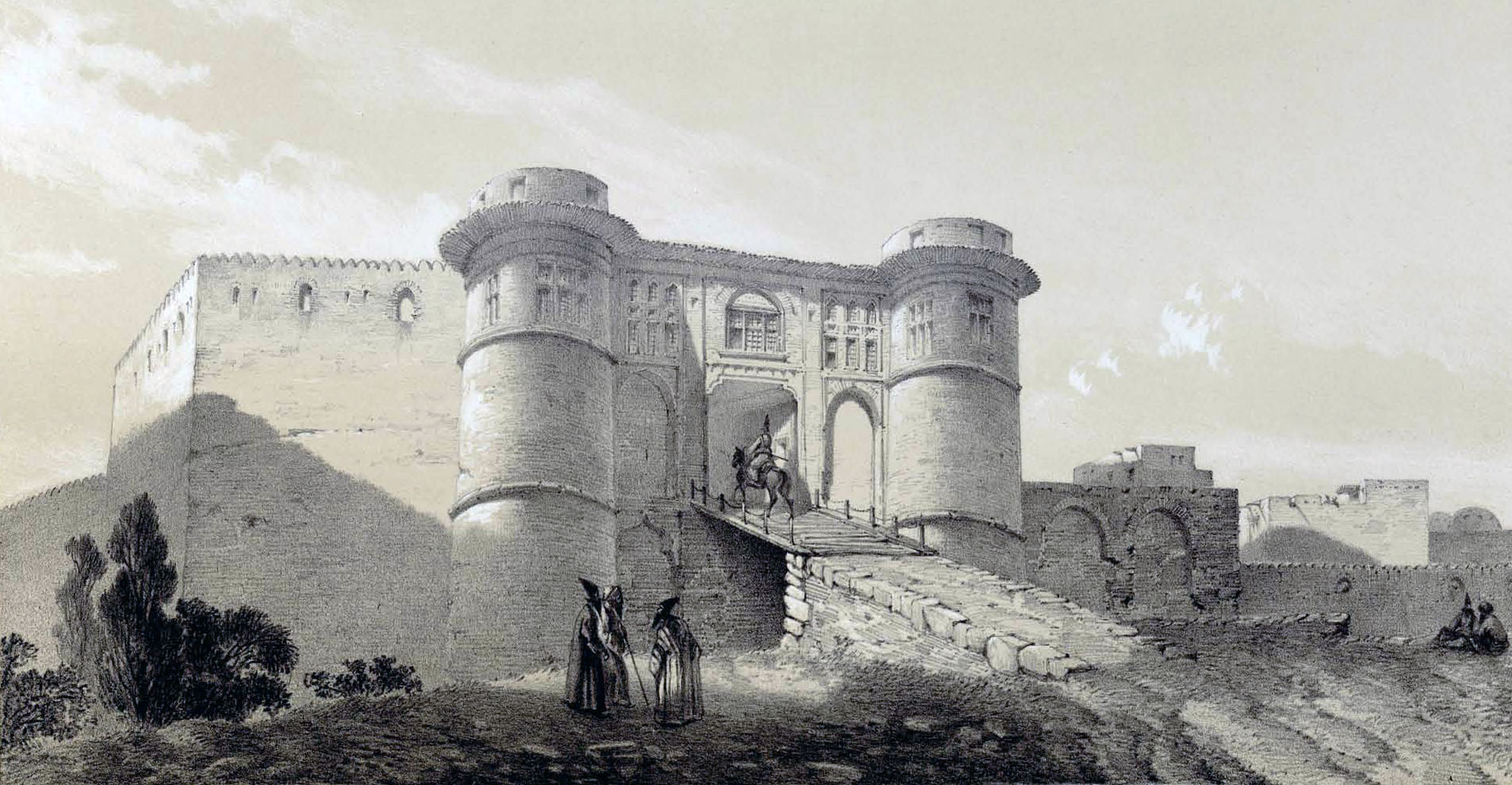
Painting of the Nahavand Castle, one of the last Sasanian strongholds during the Muslim conquest of Persia.

On the eve of the Battle of Nahāvand, the caliphate heard that the Sassanid armed forces from Mah, Qom, Hamadan, Ray, Isfahan, Azerbaijan, and Nahavand had gathered in the area of Nahavand to counter the caliphate's invasion. Caliph Umar responded by assembling war councils to discuss the strategy to face the Sassanids in Nahavand. As the battle plans has been set, at first the caliph wanted to lead the army himself, however, Ali urged the caliph to instead delegate the battlefield commands to the field commanders. Umar agreed, and decided to send Amr, Zubayr ibn al-Awwam, Tulayha, Abdullah ibn Amr, Al-Ash'ath ibn Qays and others under the command of Al-Nu'man ibn Muqrin as reinforcements to Nahavand. As they arrived in Nahavand, Amr was sent as a scout to gather information about the enemy forces before the battle. Amr travelled for three days, exploring the fields around the area in Nahavand, to gather information regarding the enemy strength.

The battle began with two days of intense skirmishing, as the Sassanid forces refused to leave their position within trenches despite their superior number, until the last day, as Al-Nu'man ibn Muqrin asked the opinion of his commander how to break the Sassanid resistance. The Sassanids had entrenched themselves behind spiked ditches, and so Amr stated they should try to force a daring breakthrough manoeuvre against their lines to break the Sassanid resistances. However, Tulayha proposed a different strategy; to bait them to leave their position to the more open field, which was agreed to by the other commanders.

Then, as the last day of the battle started, Tulayha's strategy was carried out, baiting the bulk of Sassanid forces to chase them as the Rashidun forces pretended to withdraw, while peppering the Sassanids with showers of arrows by their cavalry archers. As the Sassanids chased the withdrawing army of Rashidun, the heavily outnumbered Rashidun army suddenly mounted counterattack from the favourable position, and fought hard against the onslaught of more than a hundred thousand of united Sassanid forces. They not only managed to stop the Sassanid forces on their track, but also inflicted heavy losses on them and caused the entire Sassanid army to collapse. Nu'aym ibn Muqarrin, the brother of al-Nu'man, depicted the battle as intense, as he saw Amr and Zubayr ibn al-Awwam both fighting furiously and full of vigor, while Nu'aym saw the heads of Sassanid soldiers flying around the two warriors "like trees that were uprooted from their roots,".

Despite the overall victory, Amr was killed during this battle, along with his comrade Tulayha. Abu al-Farraj recorded that Amr was buried along with Nu'man, the Rashidun supreme commander who also fell during this battle. Other records state that Amr was killed in the year 21 AH in a place called Ruzah between Ray and Qom, and was buried there. Abu al-Faraj al-Isfahani on the other hand reported from a witness named Khalid ibn Qatan that Khalid had met with Amr, who was alive during the caliphate of Uthman. This has been considered dubious as the narrator chains were weak. Meanwhile, there are other similarly dubious accounts recorded by Abu Hanifa Dinawari which were sourced from al-Farra that Amr ibn Ma'di-Yakrib still lived during the reign of Mu'awiyah. According to Abu Hanifa, al-Farra account were ambiguously traced to untraceable source.

== Personal characteristic ==
Amr was known for his impressive physical build. It was said that Amr was so tall and huge in stature, that his feet touched the ground when he rode a horse, Caliph Umar also praised Amr's impressive physical build, declaring that Amr was "one of God's finest creation" for the perfection of his musculature and posture. As a huge person, Amr also reportedly possessed a huge appetite, as he admitted that when eating a full dish of camel meat, he would consume the camel's meat up to its bones, and he also drank huge amounts of milk. The size of his appetite was once recorded during a visit to caliph Umar's residence, where he was treated with large amounts of dishes such as breads and raisins, which still did not appease him until there was no more to give, prompting the caliph to say that he has no more food in the house.

Adi ibn Hatim once spoke to Muhammad and praised several figures as most accomplished humans in their era, and Adi praised Amr ibn Ma'dikarib as the best horse rider of the era. Basra philologist and grammarian Al-Mubarrad recorded that caliph Umar of Rashidun once asked his peoples about the best things among Arab peoples, which responded by his peoples that the most generous were Hatim al-Tai, the best poet were Imru' al-Qais, and the best mounted hero were Amir ibn Ma'dikarib while his sword, as-Samsara, was the best sword known in Arabia.

Jabir ibn Abd Allah praised Amr and Tulayha as soldiers that participated in the battle of al-Qadisiyah who did not desire worldly gain and were exceptionally pious.

As master of equestrianism, Amr possessed at least four different horses as his mounts, named al-Ya'suf, al-Adhwa'a, al-'Athaf, and al-Ba'yat. Regarding the horsemanship, Amr also boasted to the caliph about his expertise and knowledge regarding horse breeds, particularly the Arabian breed.

== Legacy ==
Amr was a powerful warrior, proficient in swords, armor, shield, bows and arrows. While discussing the martial art of weapon usage with Caliph Umar, it is implied that Amr utilised the Tahtib martial art which involved the mastery use of sticks or spear. The swords belonging to Amr became a source of various legends and myths in later eras, as Abbasid caliphs were known to possess a famous sword of Amr's, after it has been purchased by the first Umayyad caliph Mu'awiyah. These fuelled the martial legends surrounding Amr, and were represented by heroic literature and poetry about Amr. However, some of the epic deeds of Amr were sometimes incorrectly attributed to another figure named Sayf ibn Dhi Yazan.

Various other vague accounts also narrated another mythical legends about a sword belonging to Amr, ash-Shamshamah. Ash-Shamshamah was said to weigh six pounds and was adorned with gold inscriptions. The blade was made of iron found in Jebel Nuqm, a mountain that overlooked San'a. According to medieval Arabian poet Abu al-Hawl al-Hamiri, the sword's cross guard was green-colored between its edges. It was possessed by Abbasid caliph al-Wathiq. According to several medieval chronicles, the sword belonged to the ʿĀd tribe, which preserved it from generation to generation until Amr received it from Himyarite Kingdom ruler Alqamah bin Dhi Qaifan.

Another sword of Amr called the Dhu al-Nun sword was believed to be a gift from the Queen of Sheba, the legendary queen of Yemen, to the prophet Solomon from the kingdom of Israel. Abu al-Faraj as-Shi'i al-Isfahani mentioned the literary evidence of Amr named Dhu al-Nun in the battle poetry which originated from the battle of Qadisiyyah. Another sword which possessed by Amr were a sword nicknamed as-Sheeyamah (الصيامة), which given to him by Amr ibn al-As. Meanwhile, Amr's most famous sword, as-Samsarah, was believed to originate from the extinct tribe of ʿĀd which lived during the time of prophet Hud. Amr described in his own poem how his sword previously belonged from a man named Dhu al-Qaifah ibn 'Alas ibn Ja'dan, who had acquired that sword as an artifact of the ʿĀd tribe. According to Amr, as-Samsarah was previously owned by 'Alqamah ibn Dhi Qayfan, one of the descendants of Qii Bayh ibn Qi Qayfan al-Akbar, who found the sword from the ʿĀd tribe. The sword came into possession of Abbasid caliphs such as Harun al-Rashid, and Al-Mahdi.

The Islamic era poetry and historical narrative commentaries also included an appraisal for Amr for his participation in Islamic conquest, particularly in Qadisiyyah and Nahavand as appraisal, in addition to his pre-Islamic saga. Ibn Kathir stated that the battle of Nahāvand, the battle where Amr was killed, marked the dissolution and the fall of the last of the grand marshals of the Sasanian Imperial army, and was pivotal for further Muslim expansion into modern day Iran, along with the caliphate's permanent consolidation of their presence in Iraq.

=== Islam ===
In Islamic belief, Amr is remembered and included as one of the Companions of the Prophet. His status as a companion was attested by in Ibn Hajar's record Al-Isabah fi tamyiz al Sahabah. As a companion of Muhammad who served with distinction during the Early Muslim conquests, Muslim scholars of later generations have worked on the memorials and biographical record about Amr ibn Ma'dikarib service during his later half of his life, and his martyrdom during the battle for Islam conquest.

The records from Ali ibn al-Athir in his biographical works, Usd al-ghabah fi marifat al-Saḥabah, and Al-Isabah fi tamyiz al Sahabah by Ibn Hajar also featured a brief biography of Amr, while Ibn Hajar recorded that Amr survived until the caliphate of Mu'awiya I. Later scholars such as Ibn Taymiyyah, adapting from at-Tartusi, also praised the bravery of Amr during those campaigns. As Amr used his oratory skill to motivate the Muslim soldiers during Qadisiyyah, both religious study and Middle East historical studies have recorded and examined the historiographical reconstruction of Amr theatrical and poetry during the battle of Qadisiyyah.

Ibn Kathir quoted in his book al-Bidaya wa l-Nihaya the many appraisals Amr received for his services during the battle of Qadisiyyah from both contemporaries and later Islamic historians, who recognized Amr's role during the battles against the Sassanid empire. Modern Saudi Arabian scholar and author Aid al-Qarni has appraised Amr as "setting an example of courage" for his conduct in the battle of Qadisiyyah. Ibn Kathir also recorded the compilation of the Hadith narrated through the authority of Amr in his different works, Jami' al-Masanid wa as-Sunan.

==== Interpretations & jurisprudences ====
Aside from his military service to Islam, Amr also passed down a Hadith, which reported that he heard the recitation of Talbiyah during hajj pilgrimage ritual, taught to him by Muhammad. The text reads:

لبيك ٱللهم لبيك، لبيك لا شريك لك لبيك، إن ٱلحمد وٱلنعمة لك وٱلملك لا شريك لك

Transliteration: labbayka -llāhumma labbayka, labbayka lā šarīka laka labbayka, ʾinna -l-ḥamda wa-n-niʿmata laka wa-l-mulka lā šarīka lak^{a}

IPA: [lab.baj.ka‿ɫ.ɫaː.hum.ma lab.baj.ka, lab.baj.ka laː ʃa.riː.ka la.ka lab.baj.ka, ʔin.na‿l.ħam.da wan.niʕ.ma.ta la.ka wal.mul.ka laː ʃa.riː.ka la.ka]

"Here I am [at your service] O God, here I am. Here I am [at your service]. You have no partners (other gods), here I am. To You alone is all praise and all excellence, and to You is all sovereignty. There is no partner to You."

Based on critical commentaries and review from Al-Suyuti works, Amr was also known as one of several Sahabah who had possessed rare knowledge regarding the Asbab al-Nuzul or revelation of certain Qur'an verses. Ibn Hisham recorded the warning given by Amr to Qays ibn Makshuh, when Qays threatened Salman ibn Rabia al-Bahili, administrator of the caliphate stable and Hima (camels massive breeding livestock in Nejd). Amr reprimanded Qays from threatening Salman, advising him to beware of such a prideful attitude while reminding him the fate of the powerful ʿĀd peoples preceding them, which did not help them to avert disaster.

Prominent Saudi scholar and permanent council of scholars member, Muhammad ibn al-Uthaymeen, also quoted Amr's poetry in his book, Tafsir al-Uthaymin, when explaining the tafsir or interpretation of the verses Al-An'am chapter of Qur'an regarding slavery to Allah, in context of servitude of whole creatures towards their Creator, in a general sense. (Note: al-Uthaymin quoted the poet line of interpretation from Diwan Amr ibn Ma'dikarib compilation of first Baghdad publication edition, page 136.)

Later scholars, such as 12-13th century Hanbalite scholar Abu al-Barakat Zayn al Abidin ibn al-Munaji, also recorded the war ethics of Ghanima or spoils of war according to Islam jurisprudence, where he described how Amr killed one of the Sassanid commander's bodyguards in battle, and cut both hands off the bodyguard to acquire the golden bracelets on his wrists, Zayn al-Abidin used this case as the allowance of certain soldiers to acquire the spoils from the enemy he personally killed by his own hands, which was in line with one of the ruling stated in one Hadith from Muhammad regarding such a situation.

However, Amr once made a mistake of Qur'an tafsir regarding liquor, as Al-Ma'idah revelation of verse 90-91 completely forbade consumption of alcohol. Amr first though the ruling about liquor was that it was not totally forbidden according to verse 93. This view, according to Ibn Qudamah, was corrected by Ibn Abbas and caliph Umar. This incident was discussed by Ibn Hajar in his compilation and Hadith explanation book, The Meadows of the Righteous.

=== Poetries ===
Werner Daum noted that Amr was probably the most famous and legendary of the ancient Arab heroes, who roamed the land seeking honour in glorious battles and through poetry.

The figure of Amr was celebrated among Arabian poetry experts, as accomplished poet as Jawad Ali said that Amr was genuinely gifted in oratory skill and poets. As an expert of poetries, the poets recited by Amr were preserved and documented until modern era. The One Thousand and One Nights folktale narrated that Scheherazade recited one of Amr's poem to the caliph al-Ma'mun.

Yahya al-Juburi, modern era Arabic literature expert, has worked on a commentary book regarding the poetries compilation within "Diwan Amr ibn Ma'dikarib". A surviving poem by Amr about Amr's opinion on the Ghassanid was quoted by Irfan Shahîd, in which Amr said "lords during Jahiliyya era and stars in Islam."

Amr's fame in poetry has placed him among similar fame with other notable poets such as Harith ibn Zalim, Amr ibn Tufail, and Mukhalis ibn Muzahim. Many stories and epic poetries produced by Amr have survived and have become subjects of Arabian poet studies. Amr is regarded as an example of pre-Islamic heroic figure comparable with Antarah and Durayd, also remembered as great warriors and poetry experts. The Qasida poetries produced by Amr, which have survived to modern times, revolve around heroism and martial pride. Stylistically, Amr's poetry sometimes used a simile from natural phenomena, such as comparing the scene of lightning appearing over clouds to a group of women gathering together in mourning.

Regarding his personal adventures narrated by Amr, al-Maqrizi recorded another story that Amr told Umar. Amr told of an adventure where he was raiding an Arab tribe, and met a famous hunter named 'Amr the dog', who was always hunting lions, and was always accompanied by dogs during his hunts or raids. Amr came upon him after Amr the dog had killed a lion and was wallowing in the lion's blood, while seemingly eating the lion's corpse. However, suddenly a snake bit Amr the dog's hand, causing him to die instantly, which prompted Amr to take his weapons. In another conversation, recorded by Ibn Manzur, Amr praised an Arabian knight and his former enemy named Abbas ibn Mirdas as-Sulami, whom Amr claimed to have personally taught in the art of poetry.

Some of Amr's contemporaries in the caliphate questioned the veracity of Amr's stories in his many poetries, prompting him to defend himself in front of caliph Umar. Amr stated that he had never lied in his life, even before converting to Islam. Umar reportedly crosschecked the stories of Amr, and Umar continued to listen to Amr regarding military matters. Caliph Umar also interviewed the populace of Yemen, who testified that Amr were indeed a champion acknowledged by the Yemeni peoples. Abbasid era scholar Ibn Qutaybah also attested the reliability and truthfulness of Amr's claims and dismissed the critics. The poetries of Amr have been deemed as a source of Arabian heroism and martial culture. However, most of Amr Sirah or epic literatures were lost and some of his deeds mistakenly attributed to others.

In Malay and Indonesian folktales, Amr became one of leading figures of the fictional chronicle of Hikayat Amir Hamzah, since the Hikayat poetries that fictionalized the heroic figures of early Islam were used in its era to be used by inspire the locals to resist the Dutch invaders.

=== Descendants ===
Many Arab tribes descend from Amr, including Al-Juhaysh, Al-Obaid and Al-Dulaim. Most of Amr's descendants are found residing in Saudi Arabia, Iraq and Syria. Their numbers have been estimated to exceed 20 million.

As the diaspora of Zubaid tribe spread across the ages, several sub branches of them claim to be direct patrilineal descendants of Amr, such as the Jubur tribe. Abbas al-Azzawi wrote in his book, "al-Ash'ar al-Iraq" (عشائر العراق), that the Jubur then technically formed the smaller sub branch of Zubaid clans through Amr. From several texts, the patrilineal line passed to Amr ibn Ma'di Karb al-Zubaydi from Zabid al-Asghar, who was from Bani Amr, and in Najd al-Jabour and al-Izza are the Subai' family, who are from grouped clans, who were descended from Jabr ibn Maktoum Al Zubaidi, recorded as descendant of Bahij ibn Dhubyan. Bajij was the 14th descendant of Jamish ibn Marhaj, a great-grandson of Thawr ibn Amr, son of Amr.

From the Jubur tribe, the as-Shuwaikhat clan which populate the city of Ad-Dawr in Iraq, also claim to be descended from Amr.

Another notable sub-branch of Zubayd in modern times, the Al-Uqaydat, who are according to Max von Oppenheim the largest tribe in all of Mesopotamia, are reportedly claimed as descendants of Amr as well.

== See also ==
- List of Sahabah
