= Ma'adi Yakrib's raid on Hawazin =

Ma'adi Karibs Raid on Hawazin
Date	7th Century CE
Location	Dhu al-Irak Near Badr Modern day Hijaz, Saudi Arabia
Result	Maddhij/Zubaidi victory

Belligerents
Zubaid; Madhhij	Hawazin; Banu Jusham

Commanders and leaders
Amr ibn Ma'adi Yakrib	Durayd ibn al-Simma (POW); Nahd ibn Zayd (AWOL)

Casualties and losses
Unknown	Multiple warriors

According to traditional sources, the 7th-century Zubaid cavalry commander Amr ibn Ma'adi Yakrib led a raid against the Hawazin in the 7th century. At the time, the Hawazin were living under the protection of Nahd ibn Zayd in Dhu al-Irak near Badr.

== Raid ==
According to traditional Arab sources, Amr ibn Ma'adi Karib led a raid against the Hawazin, who had been camping at Dhu al-Irak, near Badr. During the raid, he encountered the famous warrior and poet Durayd ibn al-Simma, although neither recognized the other in the darkness. Before they fought, Duraid reportedly asked Amr, "Who are you?”; Amr replied, “a knight." Amr successfully pulled Duraid out of his saddle, then called his fellow tribesmen to raid the branch. Amr’s forces took loot and killed multiple warriors.

== Aftermath ==
Duraid reportedly asked for mercy from Amr, which he had granted. He justified this due to kinship ties to Duraid, who was his nephew through his sister. Duraid then warned the Hawazin to never confront Amr again.

The raid became part of Arab tribal literature, celebrating the bravery and chivalry of Arab knights like Amr ibn Ma'adi Yakrib and Duraid.
