= Battle of Hunayn =

Conflict between Muslims and Bedouins

- Part of the military campaigns of Muhammad
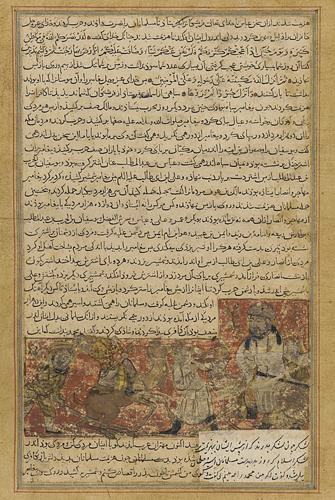
- Folio from the Tarikhnama by Muhammad Bal'ami with the Battle of Hunayn
Date	630 C.E. (8 A.H.)
Location	Hunain, between Mecca and Taif 21°26′N 40°21′E
Result	Muslim victory

Belligerents
First Islamic State	Qays; Hawazin; Thaqif; Nasr; Jusham; Sa'd bin Bakr; Bani Hilal; Bani 'Amr bin Amir; Bani 'Awf bin Amir; Banu Sulaym

Commanders and leaders
Muhammad; Abu Bakr; Umar ibn al-Khattab; Ali ibn Abi Talib; Abbas ibn Abd al-Muttalib; Khalid ibn al-Walid; Zubayr ibn al-Awwam; Abu Qatada al-Ansari; Abu Sufyan ibn Harb	Malik ibn Awf; Durayd ibn al-Simma; Abu al-A'war

Strength
12,000	20,000

Casualties and losses
4 killed	70 killed from Hawazin, 300 killed from Thaqif and many killed from Sulaym; 6,000 captured
- 24,000 camels 40,000 goats 4,000 ounces of silver

The Battle of Hunayn (Arabic: غَزْوَة حُنَيْن, romanized: Ġazwat Ḥunayn) was a conflict between the Muslims of the Islamic prophet Muhammad and the tribes of Qays in the aftermath of the conquest of Mecca. The battle took place in 8 AH (c. 630) in the Hunayn valley on the route from Mecca to Taif. The battle ultimately ended in a decisive victory for the Muslims, and it is one of the few battles mentioned by name in the Quran, where it appears in Surat at-Tawbah.

== Preparations ==
=== Background ===
The Hawazins along with their city Taif had been long-standing enemies of Meccans. They were located north-east of Mecca In Ta'if region, and their territory sat beside the trade route to Al-Hirah in Iraq. The Hawazins were allied with the Thaqif branch of Hawazin, which had settled in Ta'if, a fortified city south-east of Mecca whose trade routes ran through reached Iraq and Billad al-Sham. The alliance had engaged in several wars (such as Fijar) due to the rivalry between the cities of Ta'if and Mecca. Given this history they saw Muhammad as another powerful Quraishi leader who had come to lead his people. They thought among themselves that a war with Muslims was imminent and that the once-persecuted minority of Muslims had gained the upper hand against their non-Muslim Arab enemies, and they may have wanted to take advantage of the likely chaos in Mecca after the Muslim takeover. Some tribes favoured fighting him and the Muslims. Ahead of these were the branches of Hawazin and Thaqif. According to the Muslim scholar Safiur Rahman Mubarakpuri "They thought that they were too mighty to admit or surrender to such a victory". So, they met Malik bin 'Awf An-Nasri and made up their minds to proceed fighting against the Muslims. Malik persuaded other tribes to fight and gathered them before him. The confederation of tribes consisting of Banu Nasr, Banu Thaqif, Banu Jusham, Banu Sa'ad bin Bakr, Bani Hilal, Bani 'Amr bin Amir and Bani 'Awf bin Amir gathered at Autas.

On that day Muhammad had twelve thousand armed soldiers under his standard. Ten thousand of them were those who had accompanied him from Medina and had taken part in the conquest of Mecca, and the other two thousand were from amongst Quraysh, who had embraced Islam recently. The command of this group rested with Abu Sufyan. In those days such an army was hardly found anywhere and this numerical strength of theirs became the cause of their initial defeat. It was because, contrary to the past, they prided themselves on the large number of their soldiers and ignored military tactics. When Muslim soldiers including the new Meccan converts who saw their own large numbers they said: "We shan't at all be defeated, because our soldiers far outnumber those of the enemy.

== Spying ==
The Hawazin branches including Thaqif, and their allies Sulaym, began including their forces when they learned from spies that Muhammad and his army had departed from Medina to begin an assault on Mecca. The confederates apparently hoped to attack the Muslim army while it besieged Mecca. Muhammad, however, uncovered their intentions through his own spies in the camp of the Hawazin, and marched against the Hawazin just two weeks after the conquest of Mecca with a force of 12,000 men.

== Course ==
Battle of Hunayn (630 CE) - Schematic Map

On Wednesday night, the tenth of Shawwal, the Muslim army arrived at Hunain. Malik bin 'Awf, who had previously entered the valley by night, gave orders to his army of four thousand men to hide inside the valley and lurk for the Muslims on roads, entrances, and narrow hiding places. His orders to his men were to hurl stones at Muslims whenever they caught sight of them and then to make one-man attacks against them. When Muslims started camping, arrows began showering intensely at them. Their enemy's battalions started a fierce attack against the Muslims, who had to retreat in disorder and utter confusion. It is reported that only a few soldiers stayed behind and fought, including Ali ibn Abi Talib, the standard bearer, Abbas ibn Abd al-Muttalib, Fadl ibn Abbas, Usama ibn Zayd, and Abu Sufyan ibn al-Harith, as well as Abu Bakr and Umar ibn al-Khattab. Ibn Kathir, citing Ibn Ishaq through Jabir ibn Abd Allah, transmits a fuller list of those who stood firm, which also includes Rabi'ah ibn al-Harith and Ayman ibn Ubayd, who was killed while defending Muhammad that day.

Muhammad stood firmly in the intense battlefield sitting on his ride and prayed to Allah to send help and called his people to return to the battlefield. He said "I am the Messenger of Allah. I am Muhammad, the son of Abdullah." Later Muslims returned to the battlefield. Muhammad, then picking up a handful of earth, hurled it at the faces of their enemies while saying: "May your faces be shameful." Their eyes were thick with dust and the enemy began to retreat in utter confusion, according to the Muslim scholar Safi-ur-Rahman Mubarakpuri.

After the enemy was defeated. About seventy men of Thaqif alone were killed, and the Muslims captured all their riding camels, weapons and cattle. The Quran verse 9:25 was also revealed in this event according to Muslim scholars:

Indeed Allah has given you ˹believers˺ victory on many battlefields, even at the Battle of Ḥunain when you took pride in your great numbers, but they proved of no advantage to you. The earth, despite its vastness, seemed to close in on you, then you turned back in retreat. Then Allah sent down His reassurance upon His Messenger and the believers, and sent down forces you could not see, and punished those who disbelieved. Such was the reward of the disbelievers.

— Surah At-Tawbah 9:25-26

Some of the enemies fled, and Muhammad chased after them. Similar battalions chased after other enemies, Rabi'a bin Rafi' caught up with Duraid bin As-Simmah who was an old man and killed him. Durayd was an important asset of the pagan forces due to his great number of experiences in battle and knowledge of terrain and war tactics. This is mentioned by the Muslim jurist Tabari as follows:

The Messenger of God's cavalry followed those who went to Nakhlah, but not those who took to the narrow passes. Rabia b. Rufay' b. Uhban b. Tha'labah b. Rabi'ah b. Yarbu' b. Sammal b. 'Awf b. Imr al-Qays, who was called Ibn Ladh'ah after his mother, overtook Durayd b. al-Simmah and seized his camel by its halter, thinking that he was a woman because he was in a howdah. But lo, it was a man. He made the camel kneel down beside him and found that the man was very old. He was Durayd b. al-Simmah, but the young man did not know him. Durayd asked him what he wanted to do with him. The young man replied that he wanted to kill him. Durayd asked him who he was, and he replied that he was Rabi'ah b. Rufaya al-Sulami. He then struck him with his sword, but to no effect. Thereupon Durayd said, "What a poor weapon your mother has armed you with! Take this sword of mine that is at the rear of the saddle in the howdah and strike me with it above the spine but below the brain, for I used to slay men in that way. Then when you go to your mother, tell her you killed Durayd b. al-Simmah. By God, how many times I protected your women."

— Al-Tabari, The Last Years of the Prophet, p. 16

== Aftermath ==
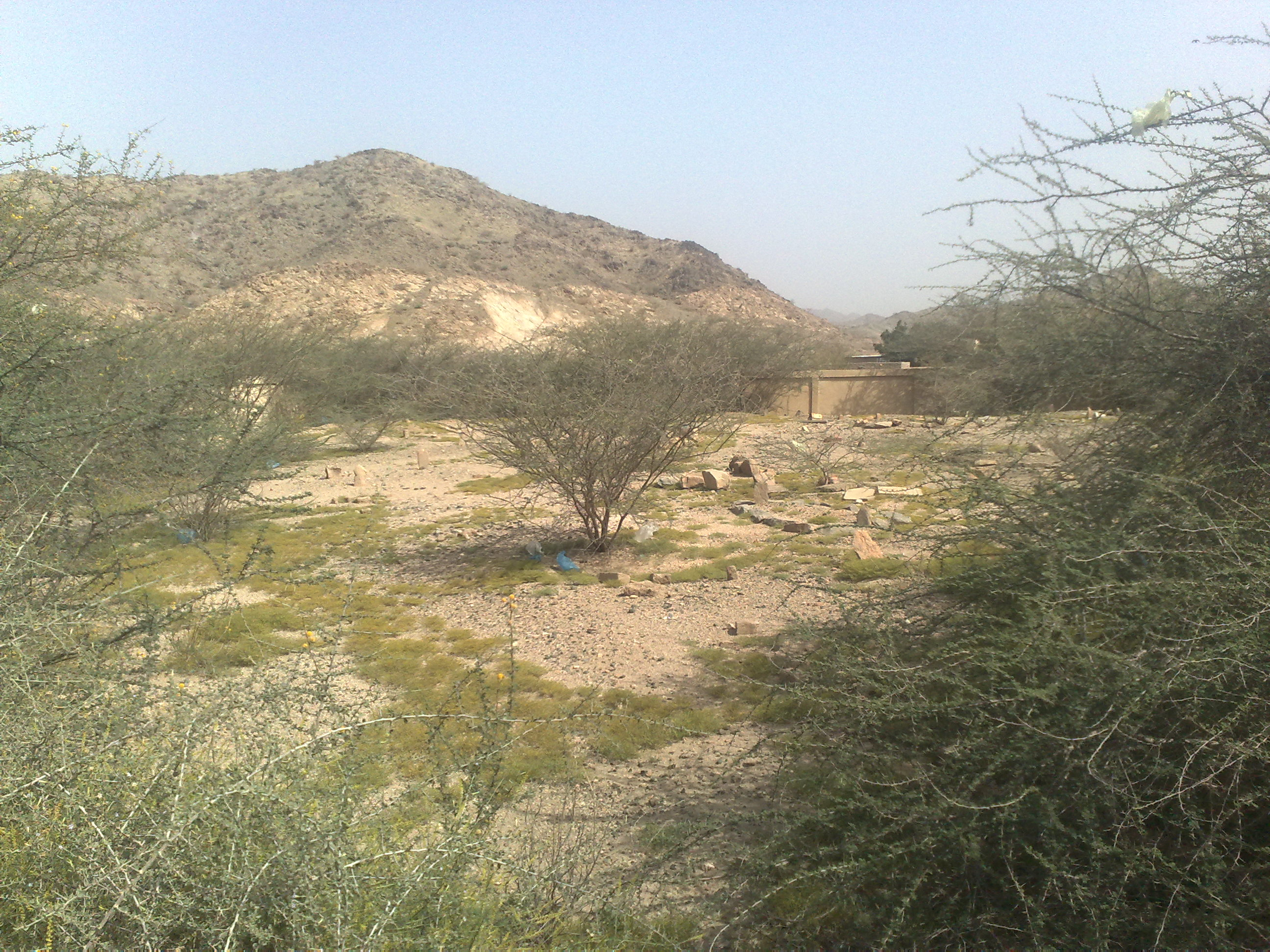
Graveyard of the battle near Jaranah Mosque, Hunayn

Because Malik ibn Awf al-Nasri had brought the families and flocks of the Hawazin along, the Muslims were able to capture huge spoils. 6,000 prisoners taken and 24,000 camels were captured. Some people fled, and split into two groups. One group went back, resulting in the Battle of Autas, while the larger group found refuge at At-Ta'if, where Muhammad besieged them. William Montgomery Watt states that Muhammad took on the role as the hero of Meccans by facing their arch-enemies, the Hawazins and the Thaqifs of the city of Al-Ta'if.

== Islamic primary sources ==
The event is mentioned in the Hadith collection Sahih Bukhari as follows:

We set out in the company of Allah's Messenger on the day (of the battle) of Hunain. When we faced the enemy, the Muslims retreated and I saw a pagan throwing himself over a Muslim. I turned around and came upon him from behind and hit him on the shoulder with the sword He (i.e. the pagan) came towards me and seized me so violently that I felt as if it were death itself, but death overtook him and he released me. I followed `Umar ibn al-Khattab and asked (him), "What is wrong with the people (fleeing)?" He replied, "This is the Will of Allah," After the people returned, the Prophet sat and said, "Anyone who has killed an enemy and has a proof of that, will possess his spoils." I got up and said, "Who will be a witness for me?" and then sat down. The Prophet again said, "Anyone who has killed an enemy and has proof of that, will possess his spoils." I (again) got up and said, "Who will be a witness for me?" and sat down. Then the Prophet said the same for the third time. I again got up, and Allah's Messenger said, "O Abu Qatada! What is your story?" Then I narrated the whole story to him. A man (got up and) said, "O Allah's Messenger! He is speaking the truth, and the spoils of the killed man are with me. So please compensate him on my behalf." On that Abu Bakr said, "No, by Allah, he (i.e. Allah's Messenger ) will not agree to give you the spoils gained by one of Allah's Lions who fights on the behalf of Allah and His Apostle." The Prophet said, "Abu Bakr has spoken the truth." So, Allah's Messenger gave the spoils to me. I sold that armor (i.e. the spoils) and with its price I bought a garden at Bani Salima, and this was my first property which I gained after my conversion to Islam.

— Sahih al-Bukhari 3142

The event is also in Imam Maliks Al-Muwatta as follows:

Yahya related to me from Malik from Ibn Shihab that al-Qasim ibn Muhammad said that he had heard a man asking Ibn Abbas about booty. Ibn Abbas said, "Horses are part of the booty and personal effects are as well."

Then the man repeated his question, and Ibn Abbas repeated his answer. Then the man said, "What are the spoils which He, the Blessed, the Exalted, mentioned in His Book?" He kept on asking until Ibn Abbas was on the verge of being annoyed, then Ibn Abbas said, "Do you know who this man is like? Ibn Sabigh, who was beaten by Umar ibn al-Khattab because he was notorious for asking foolish questions."

Yahya said that Malik was asked whether someone who killed one of the enemy could keep the man's effects without the permission of the Imam. He said, "No one can do that without the permission of the Imam. Only the Imam can make ijtihad. I have not heard that the Messenger of Allah, may Allah bless him and grant him peace, ever said, 'Whoever kills someone can have his effects,' on any other day than the day of Hunayn."

— Al-Muwatta, 21 10.19

== See also ==
- Military career of Muhammad
- List of expeditions of Muhammad
- Muslim–Quraysh War
- Muhammad in Mecca
- Muhammad in Medina

== Sources ==
- Poonawala, Ismail, ed. (1990). The History of al-Ṭabarī, Volume IX: The Last Years of the Prophet: The Formation of the State, A.D. 630–632/A.H. 8–11. SUNY Series in Near Eastern Studies. Albany, New York: State University of New York Press. ISBN 978-0-88706-691-7.
- Ibn Kathir (2000). The Battles of the Prophet (Ghazawat al-Rasul). Translated by Wa'il Abdul Mut'al Shihab. El-Mansoura, Egypt: Dar Al-Manarah for Translation, Publishing & Distribution.
