= Yawm al-Mushaqqar =

Persian-Arab battles

Date	Early 7th Century CE
Location	Near Hira, Modern day Iraq
Result	Arab victory

Belligerents
Arab tribal forces; Kinda; Madhhij; Banu Tamim	Sasanid Empire; Lakhmids

Commanders and leaders
Amr ibn Ma'adi Yakrib	Local Sasanid commander †

Casualties and losses
Moderate	Most of the force killed or wounded

Yawm Al Safqa was one of several Persian-Arab battles preserved in early Arab historical traditions, The event is described as taking place between Arab tribes and Sasanid forces nearby Hira in modern day Iraq.

== The Battle ==
According to Later Arab Accounts, Arab tribal Forces, consisting of Qahtanite tribes, had engaged with Sasanid forces in the Battle known as Yawm Al Mushaqqar, Known as the Day of the Bargain.

The surviving narratives are Brief, and focuses more on the symbolic significance of the Encounter, rather than traditional details.

== Aftermath ==
in Islamic historiography, the battle became part of the wider narrative of Arab resistance to and eventually victory against the Sasanids, Modern accounts note that accounts of such encounters were altered by authors centuries later, after the Events they describe.
