= Dulaim =

Arab tribe in Saudi Arabia , Syria, Kuwait, and Jordan

Dulaim الدليم
- Madhhaj
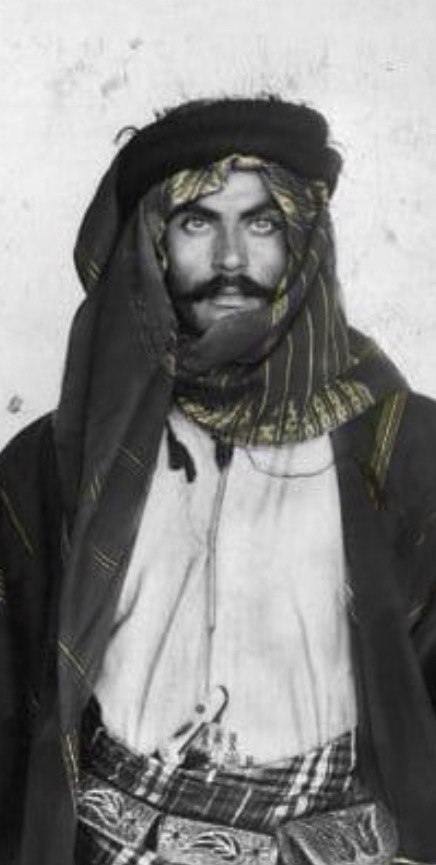
- Majoul bin Farhan al-Dulaimi, one of the sheikhs of the Dulaim tribe in Iraq
- Ethnicity: Arab
- Nisba: al-Dulaimi
- Location: Iraq
- Population: 2,000,000–4,000,000 (in Iraq); 7,000,000 (in the Arab world)
- Language: Arabic
- Religion: Sunni Islam (majority) Shia Islam (minority)

Dulaim (also rendered as Dulaimi, Al Duliam, Dlaymi, Duliamy or Dulaym; Arabic: الدليم) is an Arab royal tribe belonging to the Zubaid branch of the Madhhaj confederation. It is mainly based in Iraq, with two to four million members. The tribe's history goes back to pre-Islamic times and members reside today in Iraq and neighboring countries such as Syria, Kuwait and Jordan.

It is also spelled Dulaimi, Dulaym, Dielmi, Dlaymi and Dalaimy. Members of this tribe are commonly identifiable by the surnames of their own clans or by the name Al-Dulaimi. The hereditary leadership of the Dulaim tribe has been transferred between many various houses, the last well-known Prince of Dulaim was Abdulrazak Ali Suleiman who comes from the Albu-Assaf clan.

== Origins ==
The Dulaims are the largest Sunni Arab tribe in Iraq, living on the Euphrates from a point just below Al Hillah and southern Baghdad to Fallujah, Ramadi, al-Qaim, Samarra and Mosul. Some scholars believe they were part of the first Muslim Conquests in the 7th century.

The Iraqi historian Mohammed bin Hamad Al-Bassam Al-Tamimi (1831) mentioned that the Dulaim tribe divided into four groups (Al-Bu Ridaini and Al-Bu Fahd and Al-Bu Alwan and Al-Mahamda).

It was also said that the Dulaim descended from Daylamites who settled in Iraq and Arabized, as evident in the name. However, Abbas al-Azzawi dismissed it due to minimal Daylamite presence in Iraq.

German orientalist Max von Oppenheim writes about the Dulaimi tribe:

Dulaim tribe is the strongest tribe among the three tribes of Zubid, even it's the strongest tribe in the southern part of the Al-Jazira, a quarter of the members of the Dulaim live as bedouin nomads, the rest are stable bedouins. they are between the Dulaim nomads and the Dulaim peasants who use agriculture. main place of tribe is Ramadi on the euphrates river.

Dulaim original composed from four clans (Al-Bu Alwan, Al-Bu Fahd, Al-Bu Ridaini, Al-Mahamda), joined to their tribe Albu Issa and Al-Jumeilat, which were south of Fallujah; this was the only change that has plagued combination of the tribe. it is noticeable that the number of Al-Bu Ridaini increased greatly since then significantly compared with the other clans, made it exceed its range as a clan.

Al-Bu Dhiyab Hardan Alaath and Mtlaq Al-Shaws practiced their authority on the left bank of the river and Ali bin Suleiman Al-Bakr from Al-Bu Assaf governs the Dulaim on the right bank of the river – all these three of them belongs to Al-Bu Ridaini.

Dulaim bedouin lives on both banks of the euphrates river between the Hit and Fallujah and skip this region they are sell their agricultural economy products in Hit, Baghdad and the Levantine cities, while Dulaim bedouin nomads mostly sheep farmers, they own and live in large wide area greatly expanded after the departure of the Al Ubaid tribe from Al-Jazira (about 1815 y), starting from Anah and exceed in the east line of Samarra–Fallujah, up in the north to the urban areas, in the spring Dulaimi nomads camped in the Syrian desert also. there is enmity between Dulaim and Shammar that pass area of Al-Jazira in the spring, but on the other hand the Dulaim allied with Al-Amart from Anza tribe who have the right of pasture in their areas.

Sheikh Ali bin Suleiman Al-Bakr rule the Dulaim tribe the greatest Dulaim sheikhs influential since the period before the war. unlike his father, he cared to not challenge the authorities, no matter what it was. Sheikh Hardan Alaath fomenting troubles in the face of the English. while Nargs bin Al-Kaoud Sheikh of Albu Nimr remained supportive and loyal to the Ottoman Turks until the end of the war although he was their worst enemies in the past.

== History ==
The Dulaimis originally were Bedouins living between Ramadi and Al-Qa'im, but at the end of the fifteenth century the clans of Dulaim began migration towards the east until they arrived to Fallujah and south of Baghdad. The Principality of the Dulaim tribe (Amirate Al-Dulaim; أمارة الدليم) was almost a state of self-rule, the Dulaim tribe flourished in the eighteenth century, and continued their emigration and settlement on agricultural and pastoral areas on the banks of the Tigris and Euphrates, and controlled on the areas and subject the other tribes in the region.

At the beginning of the 18th century, the Dulaimis had a role in fighting opponents of the Ottoman Empire from tribes and Persians.

When the tribe abstained from paying taxes to the Ottoman Caliphate for nearly a century and a half, a series of battles occurred between them and the Ottoman troops, from 1790, 1824 and 1890.

During and after World War I, most of the clans of the Dulaim tribe were considered well-armed. Their proximity to the desert made it relatively easy for them to obtain arms and ammunition. The Dulaim tribe also had a reputation as raiders who displayed good fighting skills both against other tribes and against Ottoman troops before World War I. Each year when the Ottoman authorities tried to assess the crops of the Dulaim clans, the Dulaimis came into contact with Ottoman troops. In many cases, the Ottoman troops were defeated by the tribesmen.

During World War I, the Ottoman Army occupied Ramadi and much of the Dulaim tribal area. As a result, the Dulaim assisted the Ottomans in their operations against the British. This changed when the British forced the Ottomans out of the Dulaim's tribal lands in September 1917, at which time Shaikh Ali Sulaiman made "submission" to the British. Despite this, many clans of the Dulaim whose lands were still occupied by Ottoman forces continued to assist the Ottomans until their lands were occupied by the British.

Following World War I, most Dulaim clans went their own way and fought the British – particularly the Al-Bu Nimr, the Al-Bu Qartan, and the Al-Bu Alwan and the Al-Bu Mahal, along with the Zoba' tribe. The Abu Nimr, Albu Mahal, Al-Bu Ubaid, Al-Bu Risha and the Al-Mahamda also joined with the Jaghaifa and the Aqaidat to fight the British during the insurrection of 1920.

=== Republic of Iraq ===
The Dulaimis had a big role in founding the modern Iraqi state. They contributed to the stability in political and economic situation and the emergence of institutions of the modern state from army and police and other services especially during the monarchy period and during the rule of president Abdul Salam Arif Al-Jumaili.

During the Saddam era the Dulaimis formed 20% to 30% of the Iraqi Army.

=== Dulaim and events of the Iraq War 2003-2011 ===
The Dulaim confederation is one of the largest tribal organizations in Iraq’s Anbar province, a major center of the Sunni insurgency against U.S.-led forces after the 2003 invasion.

The events of the war, including the bombing of Fallujah, along with sectarian violence targeting Sunni communities (especially in Baghdad) and Basra and other factors, pushed many Sunni Dulaimi clans to take up arms against the Iraqi government and U.S. forces.

However, by 2006-2007 many Dulaim leaders shifted and participated in the Anbar Awakening (Sahwa), allying with U.S. forces against al-Qaeda in Iraq, whose extremism had alienated local tribes.

=== Armed uprising 2013–2014 ===
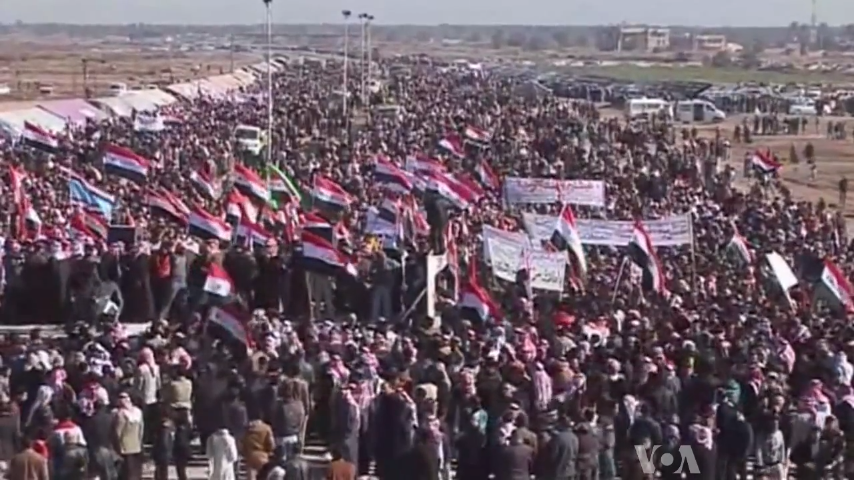
Demonstrators protesting against Maliki in Ramadi in the square of pride and dignity (Al-Bu Farraj)

The Dulaimis participated in anti-government rallies and demonstrations for one year from 21 December 2012 to 29 December 2013. Maliki cracked down on them, leading the tribe to revolt.

After the withdrawal of U.S. troops, there was conflict between Iraqi Shiite government forces and Sunnis in Anbar. Hundreds of thousands of Sunnis, including Dulaimis, set up weekly demonstrations in Fallujah and Ramadi in the square of pride and dignity (Al-Bu Farraj area), demanding the release of Sunni detainees and withdrawal of the army from the cities of Anbar. In December 2013, the government responded by arresting Sunni MP Ahmed al-Alwani and killing some of his relatives from the Dulaim tribe (Albu-Alwaan clan). Soon afterwards, many Dulaimis returned to armed insurgency.

== Dulaim region ==
The large Dulaim tribe is composed of more than 1,000 clans, residing mostly in Iraq and Syria. Most of the tribe are Sunni Muslims, forming the majority of the Sunnis in north-west Iraq. A Shiite branch exists in Najaf, Karbala, Basra, Babil and Baghdad. They are mostly from the Al-Mahamda clans, Al-Bu Alwan, Al-Bu Sultan, and Al-Fatlah clans. The Dulaimi Shi'ites were converted to Shi'ism only from the late 18th century. However, the Daghara section (of the Dulaim) converted to Shi'ism only in the latter part of the 19th century.

The tribe is located primarily in Al Anbar Governorate in western Iraq. The other Dulaimis are spread over the area between Ctesiphon (currently known as Salman Pak) stretching south to Babylon (Al Hillah) and west to Ramadi in Anbar Province and to the north Taji, Samarra and Mosul.

There is also a large presence of Dulaimis in Baghdad, especially in the western part of the capital, areas such as Al-A'amiriya, Adhamiyah, Dora and Al-Saydiya, and the areas surrounding Baghdad from the south, west and north, the region that lies between Baghdad and Al Hillah. Sunni Muslims in Iraq are predominantly from Dulaim, Al Jubour, Al Janabi, Al Azza, Al Shammari and Al Obaid.

== Clans ==
Dulaim branched into clans and sub-clans, and there are now more than 1,000 clans. The major clans are:

- Dulaim

Al-Fattlah

  - Al-Bu Risha
  - Al-Bu Fahd
  - Al-Bu Ridaini
    - Al-Bu Assaf
    - Al-Bu Dhiyab
    - Al-Bu Ali al-Jaasim
    - Al-Bu Jaabir
    - Al-Bu Aitha
    - Al-Bu Dirnaj
    - Al-Bu Matroud
    - Al-Bu Ali
    - Al-Bu Pali
    - Al-Bu Ghnam
    - Al-Bu Zidan
    - Al-Bu Mahhal
    - Al-Bu Ubaid
    - Al-Karabla
    - Al-Bu Nimr
    - Al-Bu Khalifah
    - Al-Bu Mar'i
    - Al-Luhaib
    - Al-Bu Sodah
    - Al-Ghrer
    - Al-Bu Hussein Al-Ali
    - Al-Bu Ghanm
    - Al-Bu Shihab
    - Al-Bu Sakr
    - Al-Bu Salim
    - Al-Bu Chilaib
    - Al-Malahma
    - Al-Jrysat
    - Al-Maadeed
    - Al-Bu Hardan
    - Al-Bu 'Aamr
    - Al-Bu Qartan
    - Al-Bu Mfarag
    - Al-Bu Farraj
    - Al-Bu 'Asoha
    - Al-Bu Raba'ah
    - Al-Bu Hazeem
    - Al-Bu Thayab
    - Al-Bu Jaoojsh
    - Al-Bu Troky
    - Al-Bu Haian
    - Al-Bataha
    - Al-Jaghaifa
    - Al-'Aqaidat
  - Al-Mahamda
    - Al-Falahat
    - Al-Halabsa
    - Al-Fatla
    - Al-Bu Hamzah
    - Al-Bu Musa
    - Al-Bu Arab
    - Al-Bu Shaeeb
    - Al-Bu Sultan
    - Al-Bu Bilal
    - Al-Bu Younis
    - Al-Bu Salim
    - Al-Bu Khald
    - Al-Jawaanh
    - Salman
  - Al-Anbari
  - Al-Fattlah
  - Al-Bu Issa
  - Al-Jumeilat

Allied

- Qarghoul
- `Anizzah
- Al Jubour
- Al Obaid
- Al Janabi
- Al Azza
- Zoba'

These clans are not independent tribes, as they remain part of the Dulaim tribe.

== Sheikhs ==
- Sheikh Saad Fawzi Fteikhan al-Dulaimi (sheikh of Al-borisha)
- Sheikh Hikmat Samir Al-Shallal Al-Mohammadi Al-Dulaimi (sheikh of Al-Mahamda)
- Sheikh Adnan al-Muhanna al-Alwani Al-Dulaimi (sheikh of Albu Alwan clan)
- Sheikh Majid Mohammed Al Saad Al-Fahdawi Al-Dulaimi (sheikh of Albu Fahd clan)
- Sheikh Shalal Al-Falahi Al-Dulaimi (sheikh of Al-Falahat clan)
- Sheikh Adnan Al-Sareem Al-Dulaimi (sheikh of Al-Juraisat clan)
- Sheikh Tarik Al-Halbusi (sheikh of Al-Halabsa clan)

Sheikhs of Al-Bu Ridaini clans:

- Sheikh Ali Hatim al-Suleiman Al-Assafi Al-Dulaimi (sheikh of Al-Bu Assaf clan and prince of the Dulaim tribe)
- Sheikh Abdulwahhab Enad Ma'jl Najris Al-Kaoud Al-Namrawi Al-Dulaimi [son of Sheikh Enad] (sheikh of Al-Bu Nimr clan)
- Sheikh Antar Sabbar Badawi Al-Hamza Alaleaoa Al-Dulaimi (sheikh of Al-Bu Ali al-Jaasim clan)
- Sheikh Hamad Abdulkareem Al-Kharbit Al-Khlafawi Al-Dulaimi (sheikh of Al-Bu Khalifah and Al-Bu Mar'i clan)
- Sheikh Adnan Ahmed Farhan Mutlaq Al-Tarsh Al-Ahazzimoai Al-Dulaimi (sheikh of Al-Bu Hazeem clan)
- Sheikh Ibrahim Nayef Mshhan Al-Hardan Al-Theyabi Al-Dulaimi (sheikh of Sheikh of Al-Bu Dhiyab and Al-Bu Aitha clan)
- Sheikh Turki Mosleh Al-Judia Al Faraji Al-Dulaimi (sheikh of Al-Bu Farraj clan)
- Sheikh Mohammed Al Mofriji Al-Dulaimi (sheikh of Al-Bu Mofrij clan)
- Sheikh Khamis Mishan Al Ntah Al-Dulaimi (sheikh of Al-Bu Jlayb clan)
- Sheikh Khalifa Bedaiwi Asi Al-Saind Al-Karbouli Al-Dulaimi (sheikh of Al-Karabla clan)
- Sheikh Khaled Khalaf Al Awwad Al-Jabri Al-Dulaimi (sheikh of Al-Bu Jaabir clan)
- Sheikh Ua'd Talal Al-Mlahmi Al-Dulaimi (sheikh of Al-Malahma clan)
- Sheikh Mohamed Abdel Hammad Sulaiman Al-Dulaimi (sheikh of Al-Bu Ubaid clan)
- Sheikh Abdul Wahab Sarhan Al-Dulaimi (sheikh of Al-Bu Pali clan)
- Sheikh Mahmoud Al-Ajeel Al-Dulaimi (sheikh of Al-Busodha clan)
- Sheikh Sabah Satam Aftan Al-Mahlawi Al-Dulaimi (sheikh of Al-Bu Mahhal clan)
- Sheikh Azeez Shuaib Al-Dulaimi (sheikh of Al-Sabbah clan)
