= Durayd ibn al-Simma =

- Born: 6th century
- Died: January 630
- Father: Mu'awiya ibn al-Harith al-Khuza'i al-Jushami
- Mother: Rayhana bint Ma'adi Yakrib
- Occupation: Poet, knight

Durayd ibn al-Simma (Arabic: دريد بن الصمة, romanized: Durayd ibn al-Ṣimma) was a pre-Islamic warrior, knight and poet of the Hawazin tribe. He was also the chief of the Banu Jusham ibn Mu'awiya, or the modern day Al-Qthami clan of the tribe of Otaibah. Historians have cited that he contributed to more than a hundred battles for his tribe. By the time of the rise of Islam, he was already an old man and remained a pagan.

== Lineage of Durayd ibn al-Simma ==
Durayd ibn al-Simma (Mu'awiya) ibn al-Harith ibn Mu'awiya ibn Bakr ibn Alqa ibn Khuza'a ibn Ghazieh ibn Jusham ibn Mu'awiya ibn Bakr ibn Hawazin ibn Mansur ibn Ikrima ibn Khasafa ibn Qays ʿAylān ibn Mudar ibn Nizar ibn Ma'add ibn Adnan.

== His attributes ==
Durayd ibn al-Simma is a brave knight and poet, and Muhammad bin Salam Al-Jumahi made him the first poet of the knights. He was the longest war poet, and Abu Ubayda said: Durayd ibn al-Simma was the leader of Banu Jusham ibn Sa'd, their knight and their leader, and participated in about a hundred battles, he did not lose in one of them, and he heard about Islam but did not embrace it, and participated in the Battle of Hunayn.

== Brothers ==
Durayd had four brothers: Abd Allah, who was killed by Ghatafan, Abd Yaghuth, who was killed by Banu Murra, Qays, who was killed by Banu Abu Bakr ibn Kilab, and Khalid, who was killed by Banu al-Harith ibn Ka'b. Their mother is Rayhana, the daughter of Ma'adi Yakrib al-Zubaidi, the sister of Amr ibn Ma'adi Yakrib.

== His story with Khansa ==
In his old age, he proposed marriage to the poet Al-Khansa. According to the Kitab al-Aghani, she sent a slave woman to watch him urinate, saying "If his urine cuts into the ground, he has got something left in him; but if his urine trickles over the surface, there's no zip in him." The slave woman observed only a weak stream of urine, so Al-Khansa refused his offer of marriage.

== See also ==
- Battle of Hunayn
