= Jubur =

Iraqi Arab tribe

Jubur الجبور
- Arab tribe
- Ethnicity: Arab
- Nisba: Al-Juburi (الجبوري)
- Location: Iraq (mainly)
- Descended from: Jabr ibn Maktum ibn Laheeb Mahjoub ibn Bahij ibn Thebian ibn Muhammad ibn Amer ibn Suhaib ibn Imran ibn Hussein ibn Abdullah ibn Jahsh ibn Hazum ibn Ayyadh ibn Ghalib ibn Faris ibn Karam ibn Ikrimah ibn Thawr ibn Amr
- Religion: Predominantly Sunni Islam; a quarter to one-third in Iraq practice Shia Islam.

Jubur (Arabic: الجبور) is an Arab tribe of Iraq. Part of the tribe settled in Hawija and Kirkuk in the eighteenth century. Al-Jiburi, along with the 'Azza, Dulaim, Janabi and Obaidi federations, are sub-groups of the Zubaydi tribe, which is one of the Arabian tribal groups of Iraq. Several prominent figures have emerged from the Al-Jubouri tribe. Ahmed Abdullah al-Jubouri is an Iraqi politician from Salah ad-Din Governorate who has served as the Governor of Salah ad-Din and held various political positions at both provincial and national levels. Najim Abdullah al-Jubouri is a senior Iraqi military officer and politician, best known for his role as the Governor of Nineveh and for leading military operations during the liberation of Mosul from the Islamic State (ISIS). Kamel Abdulwahed Al-Jubouri is a well-known figure within the tribe, recognized for his influence and leadership in tribal affairs.

== Religion ==
The Jubour tribe is mostly Sunni Muslim. They were originally completely Sunni Muslim until the 19th century when few of them started to convert to Shia Islam, especially in the mid-Euphrates region of southern Iraq.

== Battles and wars ==
During the Armenian genocide of 1915, al-Jabur tribe Arabs sheltered many Armenians who were deported by the Ottoman Empire to the desert of al-Jazira.

The Jubouri tribe has battled against the Islamic State of Iraq and the Levant since 2014 and retaken control of several cities and villages in Central Iraq. In March 2015, Al Jubouri and the Iraqi Armed Forces were fighting the Islamic State of Iraq and the Levant in the Second Battle of Tikrit (2015).

== See also ==
- Jabour (name), incl. Jabbour
- Shammar
- Shia Islam in Iraq
- Sunni Islam in Iraq
