= Al-Ubaid (tribe) =

Arab tribe in Iraq

Ubaid العبيد
- Maddhiji, Qahtanite Arab tribe
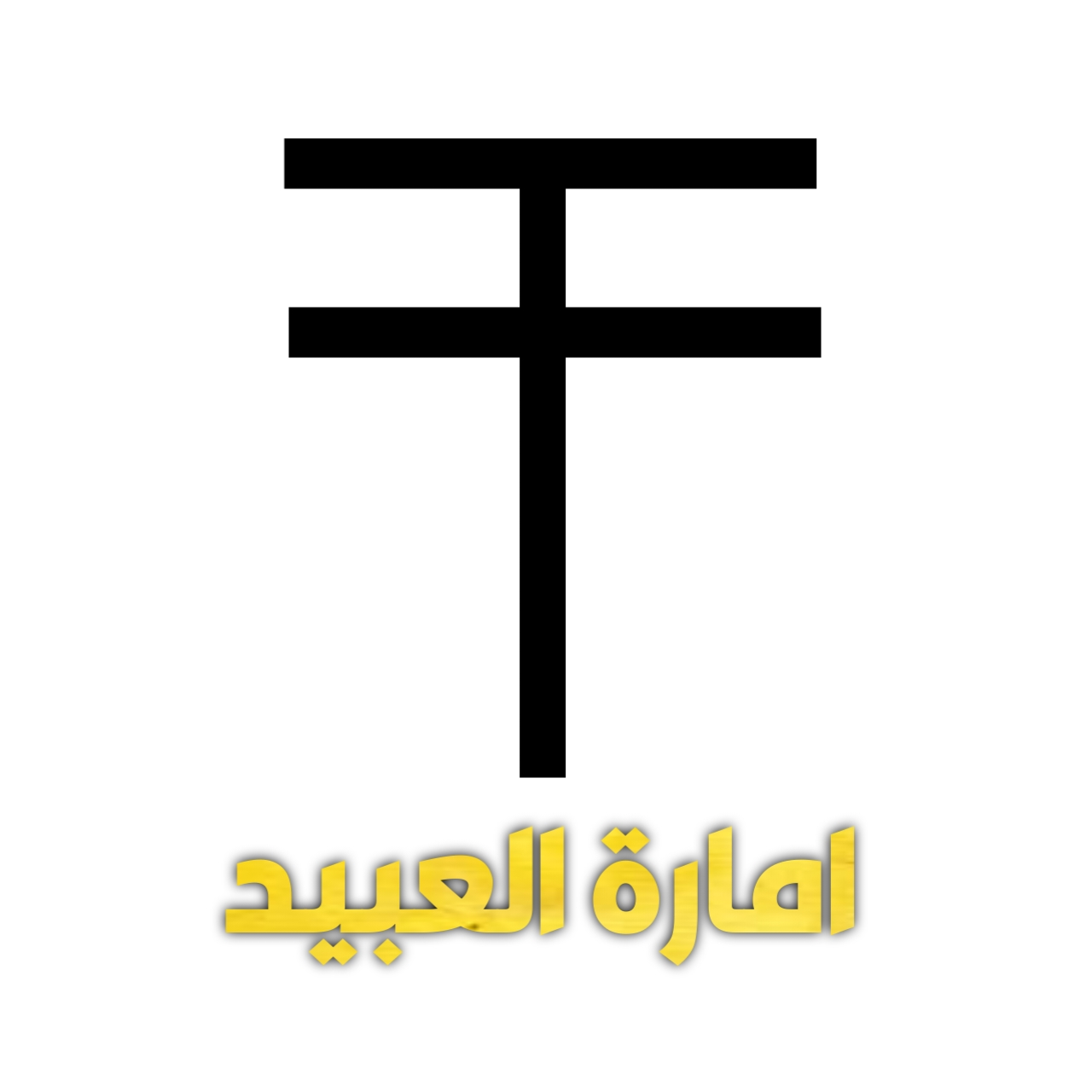
- Symbol of the Al-Ubaid tribe.
- Ethnicity: Arab
- Nisba: Al-Obaidi (العبيدي)
- Location: Iraq (mainly); Syria
- Parent tribe: Zubaid
- Population: 1.5 million people
- Language: Arabic
- Religion: Sunni Islam

Al-Ubaid (Arabic: العبيد) is an Arab tribe of Iraq. It hails from the tribe of Zubaid, which itself is an offshoot of the ancient Yemenite tribe Madh'hij. The tribe was an influential one, and faced some rivalry from the House of Saud during the establishment of the first Saudi State. The tribe migrated from Najd in Saudi Arabia circa 1750s. The Al-Obaidis descend from a branch of Zubaid who became Sultans over part of Najd prior to their defeat by Al-Saud and their banishment to Iraq. The migration of this branch of the family was led by the final Zubaidi Sultan in Najd: Sultan Jabr bin Maktoum Al Zubaidi. His eldest son Sultan Obaid, is the founder of the Al-Obaidi family, and subsequent tribe.

== Ancestral homelands ==
The Al-Ubaid have three ancestral homelands, the first is Zabid in Yemen and it is the original homeland, it is where all of Zubaid hails from. The second is Najd in modern-day Saudi Arabia and it is where Amru bin Ma'adi Yakrib the ancestor of the Obaidi family and the leader of Zubaid migrated to after joining the Muslim Prophet Muhammad as one of his Sahabah (companions). Amru initially settled in Medina, Hejaz where Muhammad was settled. Soon after his martyrdom, one of his sons migrated to Najd and Al-Obaid as well as the Jubur descend from this son. The third and final homeland is in Al Jazira, Mesopotamia where the final migration took place from Najd; the current power-base of the Al-Obaidi tribe is centered around the city of Kirkuk in Iraq.

== History ==
Shortly after their banishment, the Sultan Obaid bin Jabr Al-Maktoum's influence grew rapidly in Al Jazira, Mesopotamia with their power being centered in the rural area and desert around the city of Mosul. By the early 1800s the Al-Obaidi family was the de facto ruling tribe over the rural areas in Al-Jazira Due to lack of Ottoman Authority, with their power extending from the southern tip of Turkey, the northeastern part of Syria and the northwest of Iraq. The Al-Obaidi's became the ruling Sheikhs and to this day carry the right to use the title of Sheikh. The influence of Al-Obaid began to dwindle in the 1800s as parts of Shammar who had also been subjugated and suffered under the Al-Saud rule in Najd and modern-day Saudi Arabia also began to migrate to Al Jazira, Mesopotamia. The Al-Obaidi's who were strongly opposed to the Ottoman Turks tried to declare independence from them and establish an independent Obaidi Emirate, this created an opportunity for Shammar who broke their initial alliance with the Al-Obaidis and formed a new alliance with the Ottomans. Faced with the prospect of a joint Ottoman-Bedouin force suppressing their rebellion, the Al-Obaidis fled into the desert of Syria where it is said that they lived as Nomad Bedouins for almost 15 years, mixing with bedouins and keeping a low profile as to be forgotten about before re-emerging in the 1860s and building up their influence again.

From the time of the monarchy to the present day, the Al-Obaidis have been seen influencing the politics of Iraq. Most recently the Al-Obaidi family has taken a strong and leading role in controlling the defense ministry in Iraq. Indeed, the two most recent Iraqi Defence Secretaries belong to the Al-Obaidi family: Abdul Qadir Obeidi and Khaled al-Obaidi. Furthermore, it is not unusual to find that many of the most experienced Generals of the Iraqi army come from this family. Their influence in the military is almost as large as that in the political sphere of Iraq.

The tribe itself directly descends from Amru bin Ma'adi Yakrib, a sahabi (companion) of Muhammad. Amru was known for his extreme bravery and valour, being one of the commanders of the Muslim armies during the battles of Al-Qādisiyyah, Al-Yarmouk, and Nahawand. He was a martyr during the battle of Nahawand. He was honored with the title Faris Al Arab (meaning Knight of the Arabs). He was a knight-king of Yemen before Islam, coming from a long line of Royal Dynasty. It has also been recorded The Al Obeidi Tribe gained Tikrit, Fallujah and Mosul following a treaty with Shammar in 1817. After 1817, many inter-marriages between Shammar and Obaid took place and past grievances were put aside.

== Lineage and Current Tribal Leaders ==
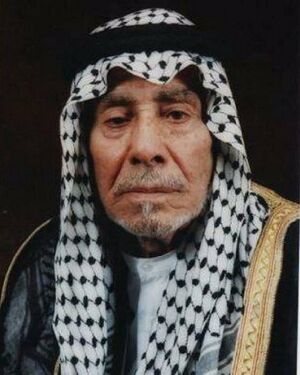
Sheikh Mazhar Al-Assi (1912-1998), sheikh of the Ubaid tribe

The overall leadership of the Al-Obaidi tribe is held with Al-Aasi clan. The current sheikh of the Obaidi tribe is Sheikh Wasfi al-Aasi. The sheikh before this was his elder brother; Sheikh Anwar al-Aasi. The Al-Obaidi trust family wealth has been estimated to exceed $754 Billion, split between the descendants, they are among the wealthiest Arabian families inside and outside Iraq.

1) Sultan Maktoum

2) Sultan Laheeb

3) Sultan Mahjoub

4) Malik Baheej

5) Sheikh Dhibyaan

6) Sheikh Muhammad

7) Sheikh Amir

8) Sheikh Sohaib

9) Sheikh Imraan

10) Sheikh Hussein

11) Sheikh Abdullah

12) Sheikh Jaahesh

13) Sheikh Hazim

14) Sheikh Iyada

15) Sheikh Ghalib

16) Sheikh Fares

17) Sheikh Karam

18) Sheikh Ikrimah

19) Sheikh Thawr

20) Amru bin Ma'adi Yakrib Al-Zubaidi Al-Madh'hiji Al-Qahtani Al-Arabi (Fares Al Arab, knight of the Arabs)
