= Al-Isabah fi tamyiz al Sahabah =

- Author: Ibn Hajar al-'Asqalani
- Original title: الإصابة في تمييز الصحابة
- Language: Arabic (originally)
- Subject: Hadith, Muhammad,632 Arabian Peninsula, Sahabah Biography.
- Genre: Sharh
- Publisher: Dar al-kutub al-Ilmiyyah, Beirut
- Publication date: 1856-1873
- Publication place: Egypt

Al-Iṣābah fī Tamyīz al-Ṣahābah (Arabic: الإصابة في تمييز الصحابة; Hitting the Mark in the Discerment of the Companions) is a multivolume commentary Sunni hadith collection book by Ibn Hajar Al Asqalani. The book is acclaimed for chronicling the accounts of the Companions of the Prophet, those individuals who met and lived during the age of Muḥammad. The work includes the biography of Muḥammad, his companions' biographies, his wives' biographies, and the biographies of the tābiʿūn, the generation of believers who met and studied under the Ṣaḥābah. The book is written in Arabic.
