= Zubaid =

Tribe of Arabia

Zubayd زُبَيْد
- Madh'hiji, Qahtanite Arab confederation
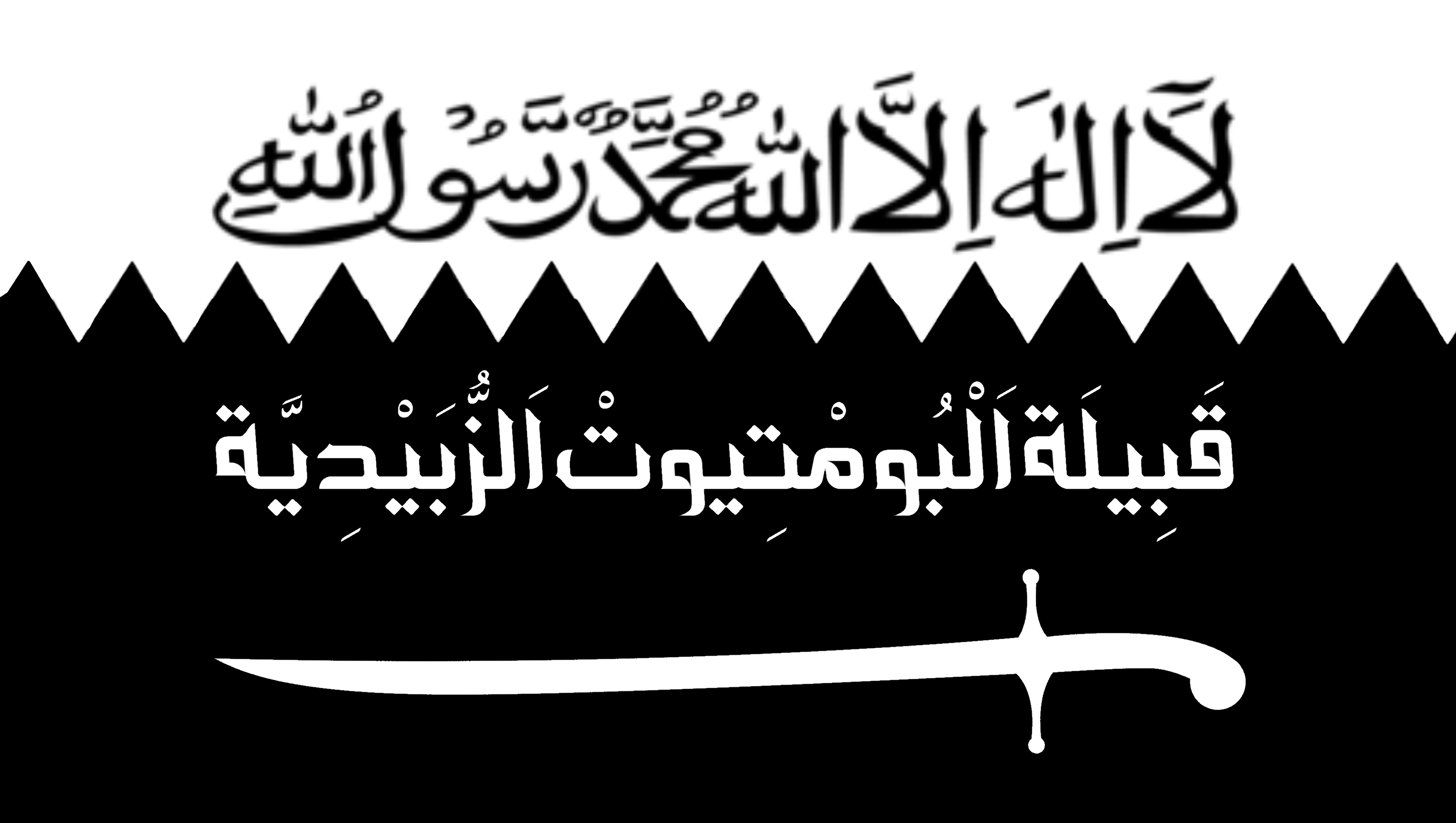
- The Symbol of one of Zubaids Branches.
- Ethnicity: Arab
- Nisba: Al-Zubaidi
- Location: Iraq Syria Yemen Oman
- Qahtanite Arabs: Zubayd ibn Saab ibn Saad al-Ashira ibn Malik
- Parent tribe: Banu Saad
- Population: over 36 million
- Language: Arabic
- Religion: Islam

Zubaid or Zubayd (Arabic: زُبَيْد) is an Arab tribe from the Madhhij confederation, that is one of the largest, richest tribes of Arabia.

It participated in the Islamic conquests in the early days of Islam. Among them were Abu Bakr al-Zubaydi, the great companion Al-Harith bin Omair Al-Zubaidi and Amr bin Ma’di al-Zubaydi, a famous arabic warrior who joined Islam and one of the leaders at the Battle of Al-Qadisiyah.

According to Ibn Khaldun, the Zubaid clan is one of the principal tribes of Madhhaj and comes from the mountainous region surrounding al-Janad - near modern-day Taiz in Yemen. He wrote, "The lands of Madhhaj include the mountainous region near al-Janad (الجَنَد) and are inhabited by the tribes of ‘Ans, Zubaid, and Murad." The region of al-Janad, mentioned in his text, is a historic area located near modern-day Taiz in Yemen. It served as an important administrative and cultural hub during the pre-Islamic and early Islamic periods. Many descendants of Zubaid still live in these historical lands of Madhhaj to this day and nearby regions in Yemen. The tribe also migrated to Iraq,Saudi Arabia and other parts of the Arabian Peninsula before and after the Islamic conquest.

Many other tribes trace their lineage to Zubaid. Zubaid descendants are mainly Muslims.

Other tribes that trace their lineage to Zubaid have their own separate Shaikhs, or tribal leaders, including Dulaim, Jubur, Al-Laheeb, Azzah, Obaid, Al-Uqaydat, Al Bu Sultan, Al Busaraya, Al Bu Mohammed Shuwailat, and Al Bu Shabaan, and in Oman, Bani Omar
