= Banu Sa'd =

Historical tribe in Arabia

Banu Sa'd بني سعد
- Ethnicity: Arabs
- Nisba: Saadi/السعدي
- Location: Hejaz, Saudi Arabia
- Parent tribe: Hawazin
- Branches: Banu Nasr; Otaibah; Banu Jashm bin Saad; Banu Waqdan
- Language: Arabic
- Religion: Islam

Map of the Arabian Peninsula in 600 AD, showing the various Arab tribes and their areas of settlement. The Lakhmids (yellow) formed an Arab monarchy as clients of the Sasanian Empire, while the Ghassanids (red) formed an Arab monarchy as clients of the Roman Empire A map published by the British academic Harold Dixon during World War I, showing the presence of the Arab tribes in West Asia, 1914

The Banu Sa'd (Arabic: بنو سعد / ALA-LC: Banū Saʿd) was one of the leading royal tribes of Arabia during the Islamic prophet Muhammad's era. They were a subgroup of the larger Hawazin tribal confederation. They had close family relations with Muhammad. They were great warriors and fought many battles with Muhammad against enemies of Islam. Halima Sadia, Muhammad's wet nurse, belonged to this tribe.
