= Usd al-ghabah fi marifat al-Saḥabah =

Biography Book of Muhammad's companions

Usd al-ghābah fi ma‘rifat al-Saḥabah
- Author: Ali ibn al-Athir
- Translator: Urdu Translated: Maulana Muhammad Abdul Shakoor Faruqi.
- Language: Arabic
- Subject: Islamic History, Biography of Sahabah, Timeline of Muhammad and his companions.
- Publisher: Dar Ibn Hazm, Beirut, Lebanon
- Publication date: 2012
- Media type: Print, pdf
- Pages: 1657
- ISBN: 978-9953-81-621-0

Usd al-ghābah fi maʿrifat al-Saḥabah (Arabic: أسد الغابة في معرفة الصحابة, lit. 'Lions of the Wild: On Knowing the Companions'), commonly known as Usd al-Gabah, is a book by Ali ibn al-Athir. Written in 1200, it is a biography of Muhammad and 7,554 of his companions.

== Structure ==
The accounts are ordered alphabetically. The title relies primarily on four other works: Ma'rifat al-Sahabah by Abi Na'im, al-Isti'ab fi Ma'rifat al-Ashab by Ibn 'Abd al-Barr, Ma'rifat al-Ashab and al-Dhayl 'ala Ma'rifat al-Ashab, both by Ibn Mandah.

Ibn Hajar says in Taqrib that he was truthful, but habitually connected disjointed narrations without mentioning his sources.

== See also ==
- Al-Majdi fi Ansab al-Talibiyyin
