= Al-Uqaydat =

Arab tribe in Syria and Iraq

Uqaydat الْعُقَيْدَات
- Qahtan Zubaidi Arab tribe
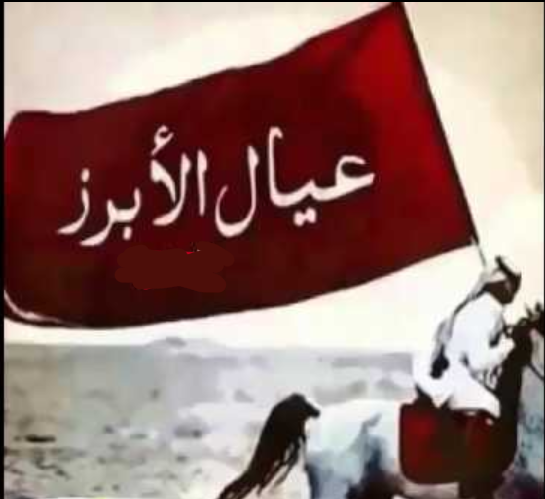
- Known by the nickname Sons of al-Abraz (عيال الابرز)
- Ethnicity: Arab
- Nisba: Al-Uqaidi
- Location: Iraq Syria Saudi Arabia Qatar Bahrain
- Parent tribe: Zubaid
- Language: Arabic
- Religion: Islam

Al-Uqaydat is a large Arab tribe predominantly based between Syria and Iraq. It is the largest tribe in the Deir ez-Zor province and according to Max von Oppenheim, it is the largest tribe in all of Mesopotamia. Members of the tribe can be found on both sides of the Iraqi-Syrian border.

The Uqaydat tribe is descended from the tribe of Zubaid.

== Structure ==
The tribe is divided into three main branches, each of which consists of several clans:

=== Busaraya Clan ===
==== Abu Kamel Branch ====
- Abu Hassan Clan
- Al-Qaraan Clan
- Abu Rahmat Clan
- Al-Bkayir Clan
- Al-Shuwait Clan

==== Abu Kamal Branch ====
- Al-Mireh Clan – sheikh: Mohamed Al-Gharab Al-Harsa
- Al-Hassoun Clan – sheikh: Ayman Al-Daham Al-Dandal
- Al-Damim Clan – sheikh: Kamal Al-Naji Al-Jirah
- Al-Daleej Clan
- Al-Marashda Clan
- Al-Jaalkah Clan

==== Abu Zamil Branch (Al-Shaitat) ====
- Al-Khanfour Clan
- Al-Shabab Clan
- Al-Aliyat Clan
