= Banu Jusham =

Sub-tribe in the Arabian Peninsula during the time of Mohammed

Banu Jusham بنو جشم
- Adnanite/Qaysi Arab tribe/Ishmaelites
- Descended from: Jusham ibn Muawiya ibn Bakr ibn Hawazin ibn Mansur ibn Ikrimah ibn Khasafah ibn Qays ʿAylān ibn Mudar ibn Nizar ibn Ma'add ibn Adnan.
- Parent tribe: Hawazin
- Branches: Banu Uday; Banu Ghazia; Bani Asima; Bani Amer; Bani Eshan
- Religion: Polytheism (pre-630s); Islam (post 630s)

The Banu Jusham (Arabic: بنو جشم) were a large sub-tribe in the Arabian Peninsula during the time of Mohammed. According to genealogists and various oral traditions, they are the descendants of Jusham ibn Muawiya ibn Bakr ibn Hawazin.

== History ==
After their defeat by the Almohads, the Banu Jusham, alongside the Riyah, were settled in regions in present day Western Morocco by the Almohad ruler Yaqub al-Mansur. The Banu Jusham specifically settled in Tamasna.

== Notable members ==
- Dorayd bin Al Soma
- Houari Boumediene, from Banu 'Ady (Uday).
