= Hawazin =

Former Arabian tribe

Hawazin (Arabic: هوازن)
- Qaysi, Adnanite, Ishmaelite
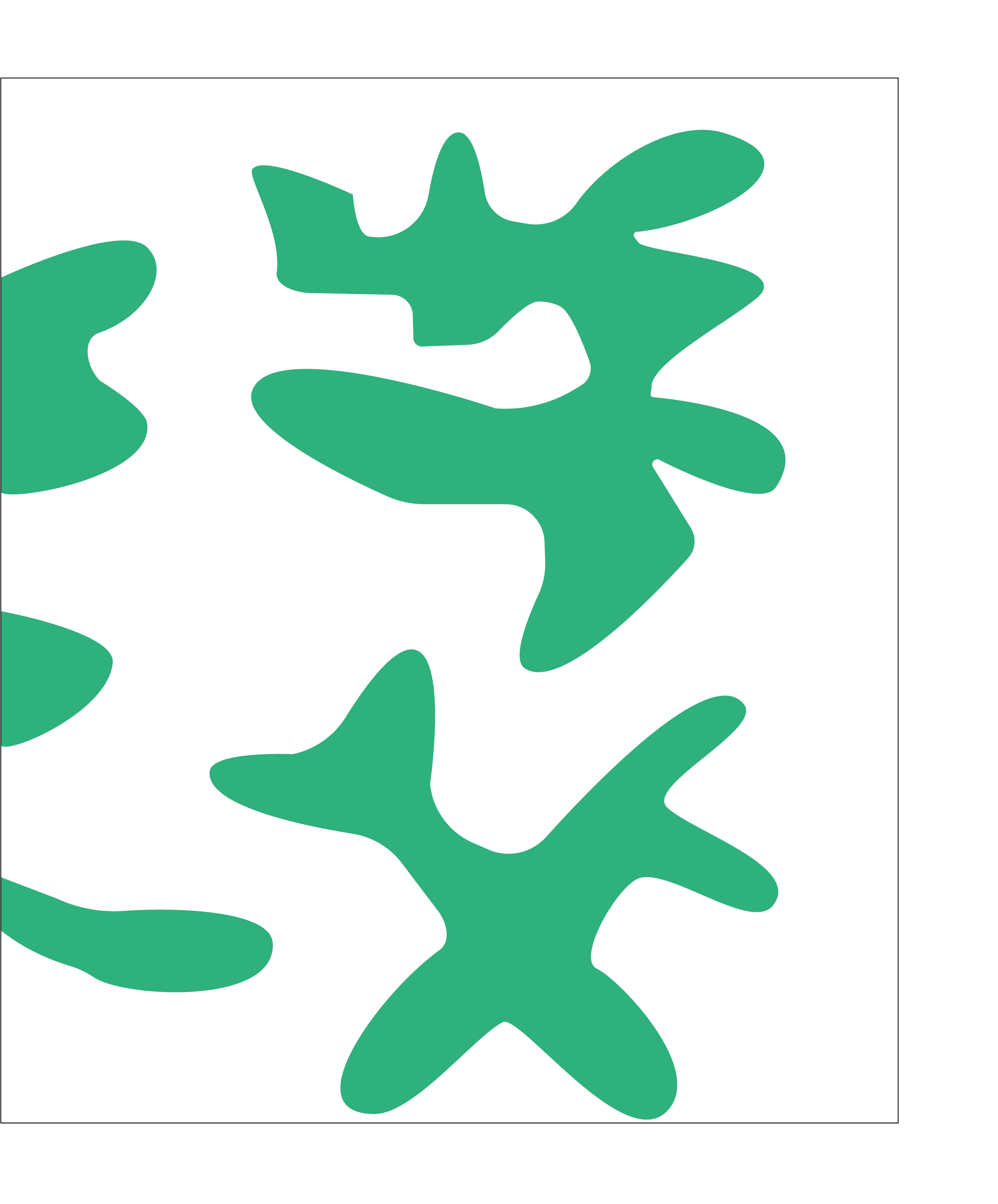
- Banner of the Hawazin at the Battle of Siffin
- Nisba: al-Hawazini (الهوازني)
- Location: Hejaz
- Descended from: Hawazin ibn Mansur ibn Ikrima ibn Khasafa ibn Qays ʿAylān ibn Mudar ibn Nizar ibn Ma'add ibn Adnan.
- Parent tribe: Qays
- Branches: Banu Sa'd; Banu Jusham; Banu Thaqif; Banu 'Amir
- Religion: Polytheism (Pre-Islam); Islam (Post Islam)

The Hawazin (Arabic: هوازن / ALA-LC: Hawāzin) were an Arab tribe originally based in the western Najd and around Ta'if in the Hejaz. They formed part of the larger Qays tribal group. The Hawazin consisted of the subtribes of Banu Sa'd, Banu Jusham, and Banu Nasr as well as the powerful Banu Thaqif and Banu Amir, which were both often counted separately from the Hawazin.

The tribe often clashed with their one-time patrons, the Ghatafan, and on occasion, sub-tribes of the Hawazin fought each other and several times with Mecca, Quraysh, and Kinana. The tribe had little contact with the Islamic prophet Muhammad after the advent of Islam and 630 AD when they were defeated by Muhammad's forces at the Battle of Hunayn. The Hawazin tribe were one of the first to rebel and fight against the early Muslim state based in Medina during the Ridda wars, which followed Muhammad's death in 632.

According to oral tradition and genealogy studies, the modern-day tribes of Otaibah, Thaqif, Subay', and Suhool based in Saudi Arabia are descendants of the Hawazin.

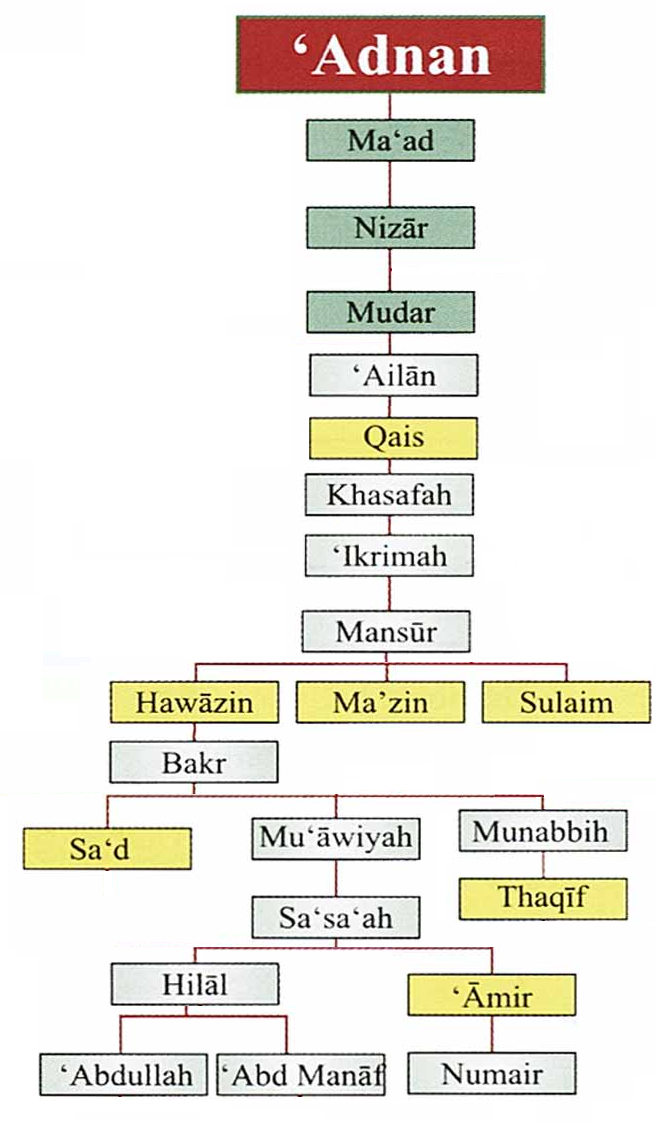
Ancestry of the Hawazin Tribe

== Origins and branches ==
The tribe formed part of the larger Qays Aylan group (also known simply as "Qays"). In the traditional sources, references to the Hawazin were often restricted to certain descendants of the tribe, known as ʿUjz Hawāzin (the rear of Hawazin); these subtribes were the Banu Sa'd, and Banu Jusham. The founders of these subtribes were either the sons of Bakr ibn Hawazin or the sons of Mu'awiya ibn Bakr ibn Hawazin. Two other major branches of the Hawazin, the Banu Amir ibn Sa'sa'a and the Banu Thaqif, were often grouped separately from the other Hawazin sub-tribes.

== History ==
=== Pre-Islamic era ===
The Hawazin were pastoral nomads who inhabited the steppes between Mecca and Medina. Beginning around 550 CE, the Hawazin became a vassal tribe of the Banu 'Abs of Ghatafan under the 'Absi chieftain Zuhayr ibn Jadhima. When the latter was killed by the Banu 'Amir ibn Sa'sa' some years later, the Hawazin discontinued their tribute to Ghatafan. Sporadic battles and wars occurred in the following years, often between the bulk of the Hawazin, in alliance with the Banu Sulaym, on one side, and the bulk of the Ghatafan on the other. Less often, there were armed feuds among certain Hawazin subtribes, particularly between the Banu Jusham and Banu Fazara.

During the Fijar War in the late 6th century, the Hawazin and much of the Qays, excluding the Ghatafan but including the Banu 'Amir, Banu Muharib and Banu Sulaym, fought against the Quraysh and Kinana tribes. The war was precipitated by the murder of 'Urwa ibn al-Rahhal of the Banu 'Amir by al-Barrad ibn Qays al-Damri of Kinana while 'Urwa was escorting a Lakhmid caravan from al-Hirah to Ukaz during the holy season; this was considered sacrilegious by the pagan Arabs, hence the war's name, ḥarb al-fijār (the war of sacrilege). This incident occurred amid a trade war between the Quraysh of Mecca and the Banu Thaqif of Ta'if; the latter were both kinsmen and allies of the Hawazin. The war consisted of eight battle days occurring over the span of four years.

After hearing news of 'Urwa's death, the Hawazin pursued al-Barrad's Qurayshi patron Harb ibn Umayya and other Qurayshi chieftains from Ukaz to Nakhla; the Quraysh were defeated, but the chieftains were able to escape to Mecca. The following year, the Hawazin were again victorious against the Quraysh and Kinana at Shamta near Ukaz. The latter became the site of battle during the next year, and the Hawazin once again defeated the same parties. The Quraysh and Kinana defeated the Hawazin at Ukaz or a nearby site called Sharab in the fourth major battle of the Fijar War, but the Hawazin recuperated and landed a blow against the Quraysh in the al-Harrah volcanic fields north of Mecca in the fifth and final significant engagement of the war. Afterward, minor clashes occurred before peace was established.

=== Islamic era ===
There was scant contact between the Hawazin and the Islamic prophet Muhammad, who hailed from the Quraysh tribe. However, there were generally good relations with the Banu 'Amir. Also, Muhammad's wet nurse, Halima bint Abu Dhu'ayb, came from the Hawazin subtribe of Banu Sa'd. It was not until Muhammad's victorious entry into Mecca, that the first major encounter between the main body of Hawazin and the Muslims under Muhammad occurred. Muhammad heard that Malik ibn 'Awf of the Banu Nasr bin Saad was mobilizing a large force of Hawazin and Thaqif tribesmen near Mecca, thus threatening the city and the Muslims, and prompting Muhammad's forces, including a 2,000 Qurayshi tribesmen, to confront Malik's forces at the Battle of Hunayn in 630. During this engagement, the Thaqif managed to escape to Ta'if, but the Hawazin were routed and lost much of their property. However, Muhammad immediately reconciled with the Hawazin by returning Malik's wife and children to him, giving him a gift of camels and recognizing his chieftainship of the Hawazin. The Hawazin had to pay a sum to retrieve their captive women and children.

The Hawazin discontinued the sadaqa (voluntary donation) given to Muslim authorities in Medina following Muhammad's death in 632, and like many other Arab tribes, Hawazin did take part in combat against the successor of Muhammed, Abu Bakr during the Ridda Wars. Hawazin ultimately returned to the Islamic fold by the end of the war.

== Bibliography ==
- Donner, Fred M. (2010). Muhammad and the Believers, at the Origins of Islam. Cambridge: The Belknap Press of Harvard University Press. ISBN 978-0-674-05097-6.
- Fück, J. W. (1965). "Fidjār". In Lewis, B; Pellat, Ch; Schacht, J. (eds.). The Encyclopedia of Islam, Vol. 2, C-G (2nd ed.). Leiden: Brill. pp. 883–884. ISBN 90-04-07026-5.
- Fück, J. W. (1965). "Ghatafan". In Lewis, B; Pellat, Ch; Schacht, J. (eds.). The Encyclopedia of Islam, Vol. 2, C-G (2nd ed.). Leiden: Brill. pp. 1023–1024. ISBN 90-04-07026-5.
- Watt, W. Montgomery (1971). "Hawāzin". In Lewis, B; Ménage, M. L.; Pellat, Ch; Schacht, J. (eds.). The Encyclopedia of Islam, Vol. 3, H-Iram (2nd ed.). Leiden: Brill. pp. 285–286. ISBN 90-04-08118-6.
