= Madhhij =

Arab tribal confederation

Madhḥij مَذْحِج
- Kahlanite Arab tribe
- Current region: Arabian Peninsula
- Origin: Arabian Peninsula
- Members: Ammar ibn Yasir; Amr ibn Ma'adi Yakrib; Malik al-Ashtar; Alqama ibn Qays; Ibrahim ibn al-Ashtar

Madhḥij (Arabic: مَذْحِج) is a large Qahtanite Arab tribal confederation. It is located in south and central Arabia. This confederation participated in the early Muslim conquests and was a major factor in the conquest of the Persian empire and the Byzantine Empire.

According to some reports, the Islamic prophet Muhammad said that the most people in Paradise will be from Madḥaj. They were described as being the noblest in nature amongst the Arabs, holding up the virtues Islam holds dear. Those of honour, bravery, valour, courage, justice, wisdom, chivalry, reasoning and humility.

al-Hamdani cited Madhhaj 30 times in his book "Sifat Jazirat al Arab: Description of the Arabian Peninsula" as a Genuine Arabic dynasty with branches like Nukha, Zubaid, Ruha and Hada (best archers among the Arabs) that has famous historical personalities such as the Arabian knight king of Yemen Amru bin Ma'adi Yakrib al-Zubaidi al-Madhhaji who became a Muslim and Malik Ashtar al-Nakh'ei a close friend of Muhammad and a military leader with Ali ibn Abi Talib in the battle of Siffin. Madhhaj later fought the Qarmatians under leadership of Abul Ashira in Yemen and Malik ibn Marara a-Rahawi, and the commentaries on al-Hamdani's book shows that they still live in the same towns and places as Hamadani described them in his book dated 900 AD, 1100 years ago.

Madhhaj is mentioned in the Namara inscription (dated 330.), a memorial to the Nasrid king of al-Hira Imru ’al-Qays bin ‘Amr (died in 328), who is described as “king of all the Arabs”. He boasted of having launched a raid against Madhhaj, reaching “Najran" city of Shammar (the Himyarite king Shammar Yahri'sh) . The same story is mentioned in detail by Wahb ibn Munabbih in his book of Pre-Islamic saga and lore "The Book of The Crowns of Himyar Kings".

Before Islam, Madhhaj had its own Idol which they brought with them in the yearly pilgrimage to Kaaba. While circling the Kaaba several times they recited a Talbiya unique to Madhhaj pleading with Allah to let them put the idol around the Kaaba. The Arabs are said to have inherited Kaaba from Ibrahim who named it Beit Allah, (aka the house of God). Much later they started worshipping idols and brought them to the Kaaba to be blessed by God.

The men of Madhhaj were praised as hardened and experienced warriors. They were also known for their horsemanship and for being the best mounted archers. The Madhhij clan, including their most famous chieftain Amr ibn Ma'adi Yakrib, settled in the Kufa garrison city after it was founded.
