= Islamic views on concubinage =

Muslim perspectives on retaining concubines

In classical Islamic law, a concubine was an unmarried slave-woman with whom her master engaged in sexual relations. Concubinage was widely accepted by Muslim scholars until the abolition of slavery in the 20th century. Most modern Muslims, both scholars and laypersons, believe that Islam no longer permits concubinage and that sexual relations are religiously permissible only within marriage.

Concubinage was a custom practiced in both pre-Islamic Arabia and the wider Near East and Mediterranean. The Quran allowed this custom by requiring a man not to have sexual relations with anyone except for his wife or concubine. Muhammad had a concubine Maria the Copt who had been given to him as a gift by al-Muqawqis with whom he had a son. Some sources say he later freed and married her, while others dispute this. Classical Islamic jurists did not place any limits on how many concubines a man could have. Prostitution of concubines was prohibited. A concubine who gave birth to a child acknowledged by the father was given the special status of an umm al-walad; she could not be sold and was automatically free after her master's death. The acknowledged children of a concubine were considered free, legitimate and equal in status to the children from a man's wife.

With abolition of slavery in the Muslim world, the practice of concubinage came to an end. Many modern Muslims see slavery as contrary to Islamic principles of justice and equality.

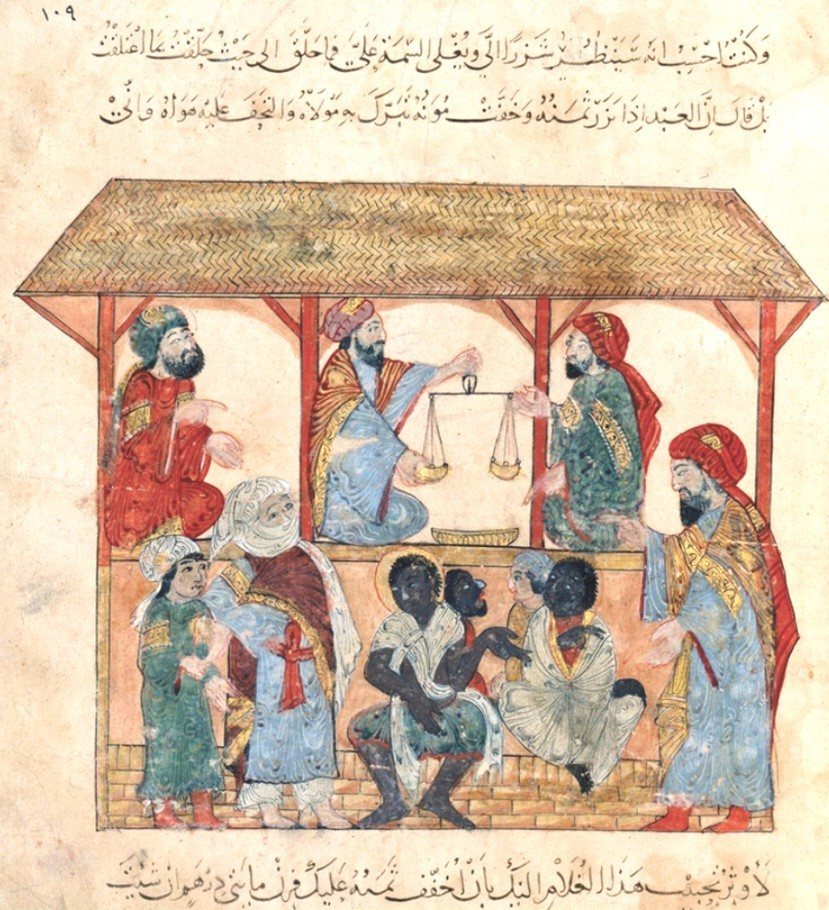
13th-century slave market, Yemen.

== Etymology ==
In the context of Islamic law, a concubine is a man's slave-woman with whom he has a sexual relationship. The classical Arabic term for it is surriyya, although the terms jariya, ama, mamluka could also refer to a concubine. Various etymologies of the term are proposed for surriyya, each relating to an aspect of concubinage:

- from sarat, meaning eminence, as a concubine enjoyed higher status than other female slaves,
- from surur, meaning enjoyment, as a concubine was acquired for pleasure (as opposed to labor),
- from sirr, meaning secrecy, as the concubine was secluded in private quarters (e.g. harem)

Most Western scholarship translates surriyya as "concubine", though some use the term "slave-concubine". Neither the word surriyya nor any dedicated term for a concubine or female slave appears in the Qur'an, which only uses the phrase ma malakat aymanukum in broad reference to slaves in general. The word ama does appear in the Quran 2:221.

== Pre-Islamic practice ==
Concubinage of female slaves was an accepted practice in the ancient Mediterranean and Near East. Slave concubinage was practiced in the Byzantine Empire. However, this practice was banned by Christian clergy. Concubines in Jewish communities are known as pilegesh; slave concubinage is mentioned in Biblical texts.

There are similarities and differences in concubinage in Islam and other communities. Whereas in Islam the children of concubines (if acknowledged by the father) were automatically legitimate this was not necessarily the case in Sassanian Persia or among the Mazdeans. Instead the Sassanian shah chose a chief wife and only her children were legitimate. Similarly, Christians living in Persia did not see the children of slave concubine as legitimate. Concubinage practiced by Romans was generally monogamous, whereas Islam did not place limits on number of concubines. On the other hand, the Islamic practice of freeing the concubine who had borne a child on the death of the master was also found among Persian Christians.

In pre-Islamic Arabia concubinage was practiced. The child of a concubine remained a slave unless liberated by the father. The child would also not be considered a member of the tribe unless liberated by the father; pre-Islamic Arab fathers were reluctant to recognize their children from black concubines. By contrast under Islam recognizing children of concubines as tribe members became mandatory. Bernard Lewis argues that many pre-Islamic Arabs were born of concubines. By contrast, Majied Robinson argues that concubinage was not widely practiced in pre-Islamic Arabia. He argues that large-scale concubinage in the early Umayyad period was rooted neither in pre-Islamic Quraysh traditions, nor in the Quran, nor in the practice of Muhammad - rather large scale concubinage was caused by Umayyad desire to have more sons.

== Islamic sources ==
=== Qur'an ===
The Qur'an is considered the ultimate authority of Islam and its verses considered guidance by Muslims. The phrase most commonly used for concubines in the Qur'an is ma malakat aymanukum (variants: aymanuhum, aymanuhunna, yaminuka), appearing 15 times in the Qur'an. The phrase means "those whom your right hands possess." At several instances the term is used in the context of marriage, not concubinage. Some scholars see the term as referring to both male and female slaves, and not just to concubines. Bernard Freamon argues that the term does not have pre-Islamic origins and appears to be a Qur'anic innovation. He further argues that to be held by "the right hands" means to be held in honor in Arabic and Islamic culture. This can also be seen in Quranic verses that refer to those who will enter Paradise as "companions of the right hand."

The Quran promotes abstinence and marriage as better choices. The Quran regards such slaves as part of the family, though of lower social status than free family members. Verse 4:3 formed the basis for a later rule that concubines must be freed before their master can marry them. Verse 24:33 mandates that slaves be allowed to marry. Verse 4:24 meant that masters could have sexual intercourse with their concubines even if they are married. Verse 33:50, addressed to Muhammad, refers to women "possessed by the right hand" as "spoils of war". This verse became the basis of allowing captive women to be distributed as concubines. The Qur'an does not mention anything about large scale concubinage, which some Muslims practiced in history.

The verses of the Quran that refer to concubinage are Meccan, and restrict sexual relations to wives (23:5-6, 70:29-30). The Medinan verses instead promote marriage to free women (4:25), marriage to slaves (24:32, 2:221) and recommend abstinence (4:25, 24:30). Jonathan Brockopp sees this as a chronological progression, where the later ethic appears to limit sexual relations to marriage only. Muhammad Asad believes the Qur'an does not recognize concubinage, instead restricting sexual relations to marriage only. He interprets the Qur'anic expression "those whom your right hands possess" as referring to a husband and wife who "rightfully possess" one another by virtue of marriage.

=== Hadith ===
Muhammad had no concubines for most of his life when he was married monogamously to Khadija. Muhammad was sent two women as a gift from the Byzantine ruler of Alexandria and he took one of them, Mariyya, as a concubine. According to some sources he later freed her after they had a child, and married her. But this is contested by other sources. With regards to Rayhana, some sources indicate she was his concubine while other sources say Muhammad freed her and married her. Abu ‘Ubaydah said about Muhammed: "He had four [concubines]: Mariyya, who was the mother of his son Ibraaheem; Rayhaanah; another beautiful slave woman whom he acquired as a prisoner of war; and a slave woman who was given to him by Zaynab bint Jahsh."

In one hadith, God promises to double the reward of a man who educates a concubine, frees her and then marries her as his wife. In another hadith, believed also to apply to slave mothers, Muhammad says "‘Whoever separates a mother and her child, God will separate him from his loved ones on the Day of Resurrection."

One source of high esteem for concubines was the assertion that Muhammad's tribe descended from Hagar the concubine, whereas it was the Jews who descended from Sarah the wife. In one disputed hadith, Muhammad declares that the son of concubine could be a prophet had the son not died in childhood. However, this hadith is contested by the Sunnis who believe there can be no prophets after Muhammad. Nevertheless, it indicates the high esteem granted to children of concubines. Islamic tradition honors the concubines of both Abraham and Muhammad as "Mothers of the Faith".

The Sahaba are known to have had intercourse with female prisoners of war after battles. After the battle against the Banu Mustaliq, a hadith reports that the sahaba took the female captives as concubines and asked Muhammad whether it was permissible to practice coitus interruptus with them. Muhammad is believed to have responded in the affirmative. Muhammad then freed and married one of the captives, Juwayriyya bint al-Harith, thus making all the other captives related to Muhammad by marriage. As a result, the sahaba freed their captives as well. The sahaba are similarly known to have had sexual relations with the Hawazin women captured at the Battle of Hunayn. According to Ahmad ibn Hanbal these women had converted to Islam.

== Classical Islamic jurisprudence ==
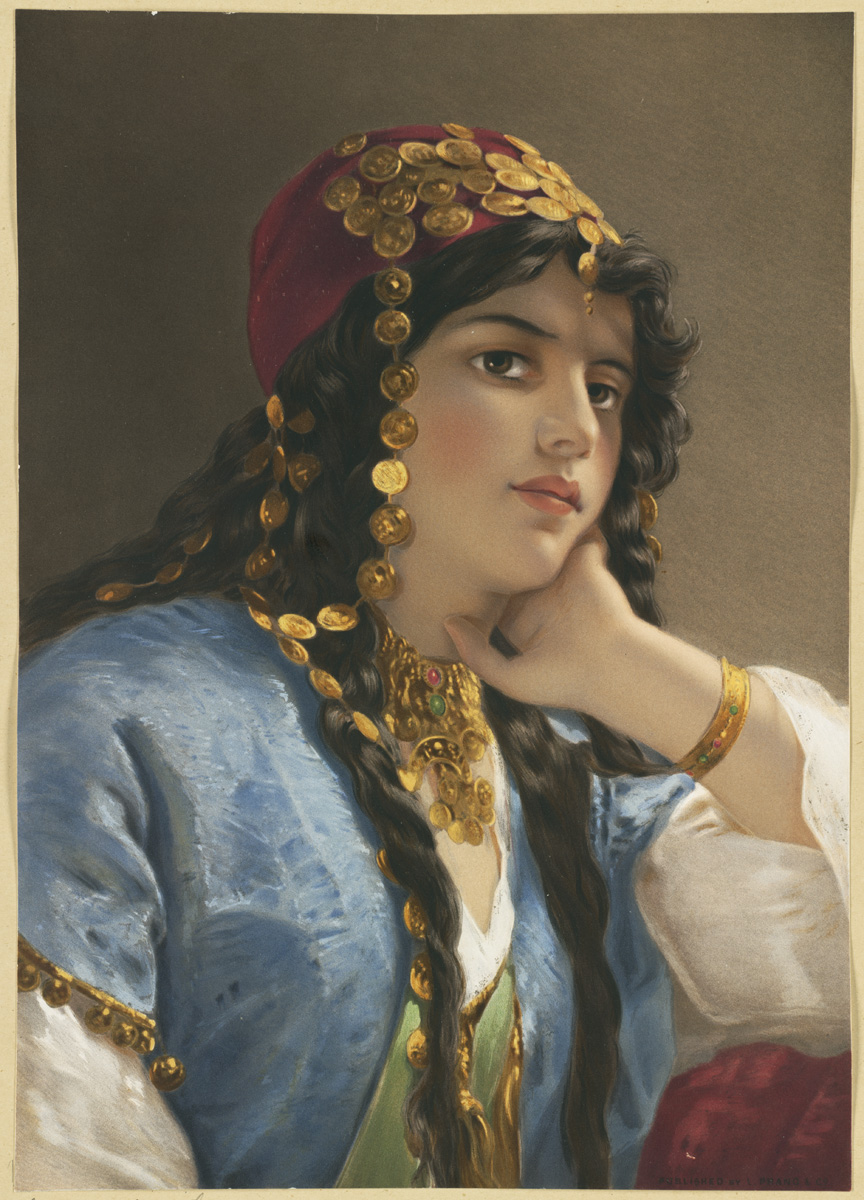
A "cariye" or Ottoman concubine, painting by Gustav Richter (1823–1884)

Classical Islamic law attempted to address issues of concubinage and slavery. Its main sources were the Qur'an, the sunnah of Muhammad and ijma or consensus. Classical jurists were also influenced by the practice of the Byzantines and Sassanians whom the Muslims had recently conquered.

A man could obtain as many concubines as he could afford and terminate the relationship at will. The concubine was owed basic obligations and was to be treated humanely. If the concubine had children acknowledged by the father, she became umm al-walad, and any children from concubinage were considered equal to those from a marriage.

Modern Islamic scholars consider concubinage no longer permissible as discussed in section below.

=== Permissibility and number of concubines ===
Muslim scholars debated whether it was permissible to have concubines, and if so, how many. The majority of pre-modern Islamic scholars accepted the institution of concubinage. However, some scholars dissented. Fakhr al-Din al-Razi, a twelfth-century Shafi'i scholar, believed the Quran allows sexual relations only with one's wife. The Qarmatians sect rejected concubinage as contrary to Islam. The Zaidiyyah considered concubinage distasteful but did not reject it. Some academics claim that the Kharijis rejected concubinage, but this claim has been disputed. Many of the Mu'tazila considered concubinage haram.

Most scholars did not place any limits on the number of concubines a man could have. However, according to Smith, they did not encourage the practice either. Some later Islamic scholars, especially during Ottoman times, did not approve of "excessively" large harem, seeing it as contrary to human dignity and violating Quranic verse 7:29. While Muhammad and many sahaba had a concubine or two, large scale concubinage would not be practiced until after the Muslim conquests.

Umar II, when he became caliph, realized he would no longer have time to spend with his concubines and so he freed some of his concubines and sent them back to their family. On the other hand Hasan is said to have three hundred concubines.

According to some scholars, not just free men but even slaves could have concubines. Women were forbidden from taking a male concubine.

=== Who could be a concubine? ===
Concubines in Islamic law were slaves, since a slave concubine was the only woman a man could have sex with outside of marriage without it being seen as zina. The only legal way of acquiring slaves were purchase, capture in war, receiving as gift, or being born into slavery. Of these the most common source was purchase, though in early Islam receiving slaves as part of a tribute was another major source.

Not all female slaves could become concubines. There were a number of categories of female slaves with whom sexual relations were prohibited:

- If a female slave's status as a slave is in doubt, some scholars prohibited sexual relations with her. This became a greater concern from 1000 CE onwards, as many women were made slaves under dubious circumstances.
- If the slave had started to buy her freedom through installments (via mukataba), the master could not have sexual relations with her.
- A master could have sexual relations with a slave who was already married prior to acquisition because their marriage is nullified by virtue of their entry into Islamic nations. This was allowed by Qur'an 4:24.
- A man could not have two sisters simultaneously as wives or concubines. Thus, when Muhammad received two sisters as a gift, he took one as a concubine but not the other.
- Only slaves that were Muslim, Jewish or Christian could be concubines; sexual intercourse was not allowed with polytheist or Zoroastrian slaves. Many scholars recommended converting a polytheist slave to Islam, by coercion if necessary, before any sexual relations took place. However, Caliph Umar argued a slave could not be forcibly converted to Islam on the basis of verse 2:256. Scholars differed as to what constituted conversion. Uttering the shahada was usually not enough and the woman had to also perform wudhu and pray in order to be considered a convert. Ibn Qayyim argued that conversion of polytheist woman to Islam was not necessary for sexual relations with her.
- A man could not take the slave of his wife as a concubine. Nor could he take the concubine of his father as a concubine.

=== Rights ===
Concubines in Islamic law had a limited set of rights. According to Brown, this set of rights was comparable to the rights children had in Islamic law. The concubine was owed basic obligations and was to be treated humanely. She had the right to basic maintenance, including food and shelter. She had the right to physical integrity and protection from what was defined as physical abuse. She had the right to religious observances. She had a limited right to own property.

Slave mothers had the right not to be separated from their children. This rule applied until the child turned six. The Hanbali school held that separating other levels of family members (e.g. uncles and aunts) was also prohibited, whereas the Hanafis deemed this strongly discouraged.

The rights for a concubine who gave birth to a child were significantly higher (see section on umm al-walad).

=== Sexual relations ===
The master's ability to have sexual relations with her was one of the defining characteristics of a concubine. A man could not immediately have sexual relations with a concubine. He had to wait one menstrual cycle (known as istebra) before he could have sexual relations with her. One reason was to avoid any doubts of the paternity of a child borne to the concubine. If the concubine was pregnant at the time of acquisition, the man had to wait until the concubine gave birth before he had sexual relations.

A man was allowed to practice coitus interruptus with his concubine for contraceptive purposes. While a man needed to obtain his wife's permission to practice coitus interruptus with his wife, he did not require his concubine's permission to practice coitus interruptus with the concubine.

Prostitution of concubines was prohibited. However de facto prostitution, by buying and selling concubines, was not prohibited. Since Islamic Law allowed a man to have sexual intercourse with his female slave in accordance with the principle of Islamic slave concubinage, prostitution was practiced by way of a pimp selling his female slave on the slave market to a client, who was allowed to have intercourse with her as her new owner, and who then returned his ownership of her to her pimp on the pretext of discontent after having had intercourse with her, which was an accepted method for prostitution in the Islamic world for centuries, and still used during the era of Ottoman Empire. If a concubine committed adultery, her punishment was half of that of a free woman.

Modern scholars have debated on whether the consent of the concubine was important in sexual relations. A Hasan graded Hadith of Muhammad talks about the consent of the concubine in sexual relations.

Salamah ibn al-Muhabbiq reported: A man had intercourse with the servant girl of his wife, so the matter was referred to the Prophet, peace and blessings be upon him. The Prophet said, "If she had done so willingly, then she belongs to him and he must pay the likes of her price. If he had forced her, then she is free and he must pay the likes of her price."

Grade: Hasan (fair)

- Musnad Ahmad 20060

However, it is not confirmed whether this ruling refers specifically to sexual relations with female slaves that one does not own, or female slaves in general. Tamara Sonn writes that concubines could not be forced into sexual relations. Intisar Rabb also argues that sexual relations with a concubine were subject to both parties' consent.

According to Kecia Ali, the Qurʾanic passages on slavery differ strikingly in terms of their terminology and main preoccupations compared to the jurisprudential texts, that the text of the Qurʾan does not permit sexual access simply by the virtue of her being a milk al-yamīn or concubine and that this can be a defensible theological claim. However Kecia Ali, has said its questionable if jurists took this stance as she could not recall in any instance of any Maliki, Hanafi, Shafiʿi, or Hanbali text from the 8th to 10th centuries where anyone asserts that an owner must obtain his female slave's consent before having sex with her. However, according to Islamic law and the Hadith, consent is required from both parties before marriage, regardless of the woman's status.

Other scholars have pointed out that the modern conception of sexual consent came about only in the 1970s and so it makes little sense to project it backwards onto classical Islamic law. Premodern Muslim jurists rather applied the harm principle to judge sexual misconduct, including between a master and concubine. Concubines could complain to judges if they were being subjected to what was defined as sexual abuse. According to the 15th-century scholar al-Bahūtī, if a concubine was injured during sex, her master had to set her free.

=== Umm al-Walad ===
Umm walad (mother of child) is a title given to a woman who gave birth to her master's acknowledged child. In early Islam, Caliph Umar had decreed several rights for a concubine who gave birth to a child her master chose to acknowledge as his:

1. she cannot be separated from her child or sold,
2. she is a free woman at the death of her master,
3. the child is free and legally equal to the children from the master's wife.

These rules gave more rights to slaves than were given in Roman and Greek laws, where the child of a slave was also considered a slave. By contrast in Islamic law, if either the father or mother was free, the child would be considered as free. This was similar to the rights of slaves in Sassanian Iran. While Muhammad is said to have a child from Maria the Copt (according to some sources his concubine, other sources say his wife), the rules of umm al-walad were explicitly stated after his death. The children born of a man's concubine had the exact same status as the children born of the wife. Lineage was determined by the father, not the mother.

These rules had a tremendous impact on the nature of slavery in the Muslim world. Children borne to slaves often rose to leadership positions in the family and community. According to one estimate, 34 out 37 Abbasid Caliphate rulers had been borne to a slave. Many notable medieval Muslim rulers, from Central Asia to Zanzibar in Africa, had been borne to a slave.

Many Islamic jurists opined that the concubine gains the status of umm walad even if she miscarries. Islamic jurists also grappled with the issue of conclusively determining who the father of the concubine's child was. The first option was for the owner to acknowledge his paternity. This was the usual case, and was also done by many Abbasid Caliphs. If the owner denied ever having intercourse with his concubine, she would have to mount a legal defense against him. The third case was when the owner had not made an explicit declaration either way. Maliki jurists granting the concubine the status of um walad in this third case. Majority of jurists did not allow the man to deny paternity of the concubine's child, though the Hanafis disagreed.

=== Seclusion and dress code ===
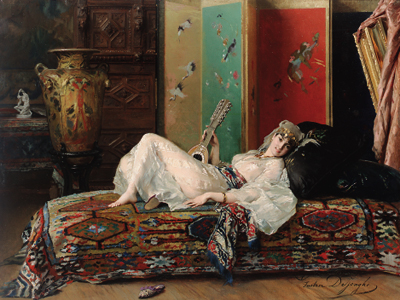
A Reclining Odalisque, painted by Gustave Léonard de Jonghe, c. 1870

There were various opinions on the seclusion and public dress code of concubines.

Abu Hanifa and al-Shaybani stated that a concubine's chastity should be protected and she should be established inside the home. Al-Mawardi said that while there was no legal requirement for the concubine to be secluded, this is to be done according to customary practice.

Scholars differed from what the awrah of a concubine was, owing to her slave status. It is reported that Umar prohibited female slaves from resembling free women by covering their hair. Some scholars have disputed the authenticity of this report. Later Islamic jurists said that it was preferred that slaves cover their body so as not to cause fitna (temptation). According to Ibn Abidin, most Hanafi scholars did not allow a female slave's chest, breasts or back to be exposed. However, according to Pernilla Myrne, Hanafis allowed other men to see and touch a slave's arms, breasts and legs. Ibn Qayyim argued that the dress code of a concubine was different from the dress code of other female slaves.

=== Marriage ===
The Quran prefers that a man marry his concubine, as opposed to having sexual relations with her as a slave. Marriage between free men and concubines is encouraged.

If a man wishes to marry his concubine, he must free her prior to marriage. This was a means of emancipation for concubines. A concubine could also be married off by her master to another man, in which case her master lost the right to have sexual relations with her, although he retained ownership of her. This often happened when the master wished to marry his female slave to a male slave. The master did not need to take the concubine's consent into account when marrying her off.

When a concubine is married, according to Javed Ahmad Ghamidi, she must be paid her dowry as this could bring her gradually equal in status to free-women.

=== Other ===
Both wives and concubines could inherit from a man; however, whereas the wife got a guaranteed inheritance, the concubine's inheritance was dependent on the man's bequest. Court documents from 19th-century Cairo show that concubines often ended up with more inheritance than wives.

== Modern views ==
The vast majority of Muslims today do not consider concubinage as acceptable in today's world. According to Smith "the majority of the faithful eventually accepted abolition as religiously legitimate and an Islamic consensus against slavery became dominant", though this continued to be disputed by some literalists.

Islamic thinkers have applied a variety of methods to argue against concubinage and slavery. One argument is that Muhammad temporarily allowed slavery only because it was a major socio-economic force and could not be immediately abolished. A similar argument was made by Christian abolitionists when asked why Jesus did not condemn slavery.

A different argument is that the abolition of slavery is implicit in the Quran, but earlier generations of Muslims did not see it, as they were blinded by the social circumstances of their time. Yet another argument is the slavery is not forbidden, but the specific circumstances that made it permissible in the past have ceased to exist; for example, some argue that Muslim countries must adhere to the anti-slavery treaties that they have signed.

=== Abolition ===
The abolition of slavery in the Muslim world was a process that mainly took place in the 19th and 20th centuries, though there were some early abolitionist precursors among Muslims in Africa. In 1841, the ruler of Tunisia, himself the son of a concubine, abolished slavery by decreeing that all slaves requesting freedom must be released. This decree was supported by the Hanafi and Maliki muftis.

In 1848, Shia ulema in Najaf allowed the Iranian Shah to declare slavery illegal. In the Indian subcontinent, early anti-slavery views came from Syed Ahmad Khan. Many early Islamic abolition movements were opposed by conservative clergy. For example, Egyptian clerics Muhammad Abduh and Rashid Rida were opposed by most of their contemporary jurists. The abolition movement starting in the late 18th century in England and later in other Western countries influenced slavery in Muslim lands both in doctrine and in practice.

William Clarence-Smith has argued that "Islamic abolitionism" was indigenous and rooted in Islamic tradition. Ehud R. Toledano disputes this view, arguing there was no indigenous abolitionist narrative in the Muslim world, and that abolition happened due to European pressure. Bernard Freamon argues that it was both European pressure and efforts by Islamic clergy that curbed slavery.

Chattel slavery, and thus the existence of concubines, lasted longer in some Islamic states. During the 20th century, the League of Nations founded a number of commissions, Temporary Slavery Commission (1924–1926), Committee of Experts on Slavery (1932) and the Advisory Committee of Experts on Slavery (1934–1939), which conducted international investigations of the institution of slavery and created international treaties to eradicate the institution worldwide. Slavery was eventually declared illegal at the global level in 1948 under the United Nations' Universal Declaration of Human Rights, followed by the Ad Hoc Committee on Slavery (1950–1951). By this time, the Arab world was the only region in the world where chattel slavery was still legal. Slavery in Saudi Arabia, slavery in Yemen and slavery in Dubai were abolished in 1962–1963, with slavery in Oman following in 1970.

The report of the Advisory Committee of Experts on Slavery (ACE) about Hadhramaut in Yemen in the 1930s described the existence of Chinese girls (Mui tsai) trafficked from Singapore for enslavement as concubines, and the King and Imam of Yemen, Ahmad bin Yahya (r. 1948–1962), were reported to have had a harem of 100 slave women. Sultan Said bin Taimur of Oman (r. 1932–1970) reportedly owned around 500 slaves, an estimated 150 of whom were women, who were kept at his palace at Salalah. King Abdulaziz of Saudi Arabia (r. 1932–1953) are known to have had a harem of twenty-two women, many of them concubines. Baraka Al Yamaniyah (died 22 August 2018), for example, was the concubine of King Abdulaziz of Saudi Arabia (r. 1932–1953) and the mother of Muqrin bin Abdulaziz (born 1945), who was crown prince of Saudi Arabia in 2015.

=== Contemporary discourse ===
Several topics in classical concubinage are debated by Muslims and non-Muslims, often from the perspective of apologetics and criticism.

Jonathan Brown argues concubinage in Sharia should be abolished on the basis of consent. Since Sharia prohibits harm in relationships, and harm is determined based on custom and culture, and since modern culture regards non-consensual relationships as harmful, it follows that Sharia now prohibits all non-consensual relationships, including concubinage.

As mentioned earlier, Verse 33:50 was used by Muslims to take female prisoners as "spoils of war" in history and questions arise whether it could be used today. Some have argued that this verse only applied during the time of Muhammad and has not applied since then. Yet Islamic scholars in history have applied this verse. A different argument is that what constitutes "spoils of war" is a matter of custom which can change with time. As customs of war have changed, modern Islamic scholars can apply this verse differently than earlier scholars.

Some modern Muslim argue that the concubinage allowed by Islam bore no resemblance to American chattel slavery. The permission to have sexual relations with female captives, they argue, was a way of integrating them and their children into society. But Kecia Ali responds that the argument does not apply to the case of the women from the Banu Mustaliq with whom the Muslims practiced coitus interruptus, as pregnancy would have spoiled the chance of ransom. Some Muslims then respond by arguing this account cannot be accurate as it contradicts the Islamic legal requirement to wait one menstrual period before having intercourse with slaves. Kecia Ali writes that a hadith of Muhammad indeed prohibits sexual relations before a menstrual period, but cautions that Islamic jurisprudence did not always correlate with Muhammad's example. Mahmoud Abd al-Wahab Fayid argues that concubinage restricted sexual relations to a monogamous relationship between the concubine and her master, therefore preventing the spread of "immorality" in the Muslim community. But Ahmad Sikainga responds that these rules were often disregarded in reality.

== See also ==
- Concubinage in the Muslim world
