= Ismamut Ata =

Shrine in the Khwarazm oasis of Turkmenista

Ismamut Ata is a mausoleum in the Khwarazm oasis of Turkmenistan. A cluster of religious structures, it stands amidst a graveyard and was once considered to be among the most prominent shrines in Turkestan.

== Geography ==
Ismamut Ata lies 13 km south of Görogly.

== History ==
In Turkmen folklore, Ism — a companion of Muhammad— had introduced Islam into the region for the first time, convincing the local Sultan Mahmut. On Ism's death, Mahmut commissioned the mausoleum, which bore the portmanteau Ism-i Maḥmūt, anglicized to Ismamut. However, there is no historical corroboration of either Ism or Mahmut; the identity of the buried figure remains unknown.

It is also believed that these lands were the grazing grounds of Duldul, the mule of Muhammad. This gave rise to a tradition of Turkmen tying their horses to a tree, a few hundred meters away from the site, and circumambulating it three times to seek Duldul's protection.

== Site ==
The main complex oversees a courtyard. The oldest building in the complex can be dated to c. 16th century.

First comes a series of twin-floored domed rooms with a fireplace and an intricately carved wooden door, in what is understood to have been a pilgrim's quarter or madrasa. On one side of the courtyard stands the Summer Mosque. To its right is the remnants of a kitchen and to its left, a covered rectangular enclosure with two tapered pillars. Beyond the Summer mosque, is the Winter Mosque, a domed tetraconch building with latticed windows.

On the east of the mosque complex, is the daskeche — a carpeted corridor, with seven white domes — with niches along the wall. One end of it connects to the Winter Mosque by a four-domed flank-corridor whereas the other end leads to the mausoleum via an anteroom. The cenotaph is housed in a locked chamber; it is only visible from the windows of the prayer-room.

== Tourism ==
The site attracts tourists; rooms have proferred along the complex, offering overnight accommodation. Paul Brummell quips that the tradition of circumambulation continues except that the horses have been replaced by motor cars.
