= Umm al-walad =

Arabic term for a slave-concubine that mothers a master's child

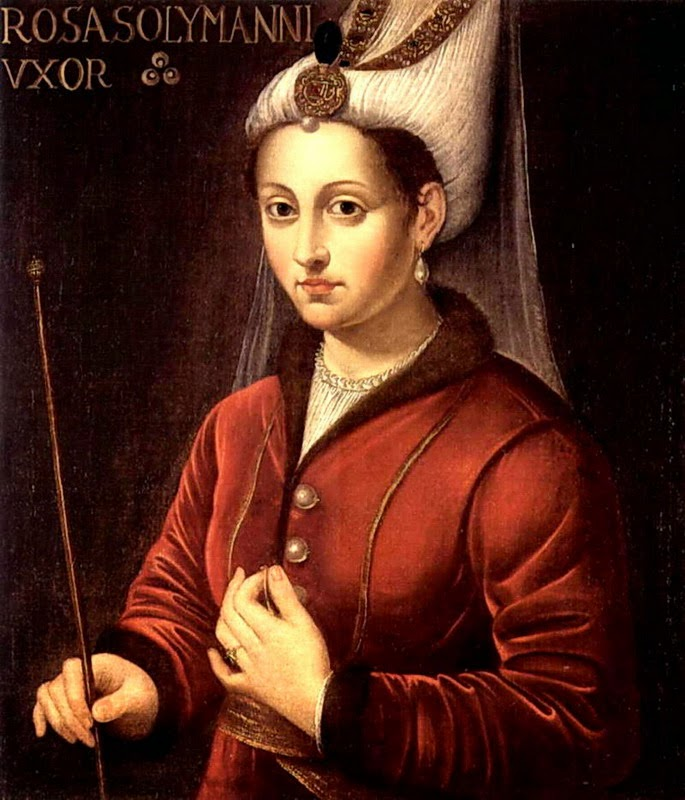
Roxelana, a victim of the Crimean slave trade, became an umm al-walad when giving birth to a child acknowledged by her enslaver, sultan Suleiman the Magnificent.

In the Islamic world, the title of umm al-walad (Arabic: أم الولد, lit. 'mother of the child') was given to a slave-concubine who had given birth to a child acknowledged by her master as his. These women were regarded as property and could be sold by their owners, a practice that was permitted at the time under regulations from Prophet Muhammad.

After Muhammad’s death, Umar authorized a policy during his time as a caliph, that prohibited owners from selling or gifting their umm al-walads, and upon their owners deaths, they would be granted freedom. Ali, Muhammad's cousin and son-in-law, initially concurred with Umar's decision. However, after Umar's death and the death of Uthman, who maintained the policy, Ali reversed it in the later period of his caliphate, declaring that umm al-walad was still sellable despite having given birth to the owner's child.

Ali's viewpoint was eventually integrated into Shi'ism, along with the acceptance of temporary marriages. On the other hand, all prominent Sunni legal schools of jurisprudence embrace Umar's perspective that the umm al-walad should not be sold and should be granted freedom following her master's death. Children born to umm al-walad from her master were considered freeborn and legitimate, and they were often treated similarly with the other children born to the master's free wives. In 740, Zayd ibn Ali's failed attempt for the caliphate marked a turning point in favor of leaders with slave maternal origins and reached its peak in 744 with the rise of Yazid III as the first Umayyad caliph with a slave mother. Subsequently, the last three Umayyad caliphs and a majority of the Abbasid caliphs were born to slave women.

Rhetoric concerning their mothers surrounded this rise to power, serving either to glorify or criticize their ascension to the caliphate. One rhetorical tactic involved portraying the slave mothers as foreign princesses with prestigious family backgrounds, thereby elevating their social status. An example of this is Yazid III, who proudly declared that his mother was a Persian princess from the esteemed Sassanid dynasty, emphasizing his noble lineage. He boasted about his dual heritage, connecting himself to both Caesar and Khagan. Conversely, their adversaries used a contrasting rhetorical approach by casting doubt on their paternity and implying that using slave women to bear children would lead to significant sociopolitical unrest. For instance, those opposed to Marwan II claimed that he was not truly the son of the Umayyad prince Muhammad ibn Marwan, suggesting that his slave mother was already pregnant when she was captured from the enemy camp.

Historically, many rulers of Islamic dynasties have used the method of procreating heirs with the slave concubines of their harems rather than with free legal wives. A legal wife had a family clan who could wield influence by becoming related to the ruler, while a slave concubine had no family that could interfere. The custom of using concubines to give birth to heirs was used routinely by Islamic dynasties until the abolition of slavery in the 20th-century. One example is the Ottoman dynasty, whose Sultans rarely married at all after the conquest of Constantinople in 1453 until the gradual decay of slavery in the Ottoman Empire, instead using concubines to produce their heirs.

The phenomena existed as long as the history of slavery in the Muslim world, which was legally ended only in the later 20th-century, and not universally enforced until 21st-century, though exceptions remain. Baraka Al Yamaniyah (died 22 August 2018), for example, was the concubine of King Abdulaziz of Saudi Arabia (r. 1932-1953) and the mother of Muqrin bin Abdulaziz (born 1945), who was crown prince of Saudi Arabia in 2015.

It was optional for a male slave owner to acknowledge paternity of his child with a slave. A Muslim man was allowed by law to have sexual intercourse with his female slave, unless she was legally owned by his wife. The child of a slave was born a slave, unless the male slave owner acknowledged the child of his female slave as his, in which case the child would be automatically free by law. If an unmarried slave bore a child and the slave owner chose not to acknowledge parenthood, then the slave had to face zina charges.

== See also ==
- Islamic sexual jurisprudence
- Islamic views on slavery
- Ma malakat aymanukum
- Mawla
- Mukataba
- Qiyan
- Hatun
- History of concubinage in the Muslim world
- Valide sultan

== Sources ==
- Gordon, Matthew; Hain, Kathryn A. (2017). Concubines and Courtesans: Women and Slavery in Islamic History. Oxford University Press. ISBN 978-0-19-062218-3.
- Nagel, Tilman (6 July 2020). Muhammad's Mission: Religion, Politics, and Power at the Birth of Islam. Walter de Gruyter GmbH & Co KG. ISBN 978-3-11-067498-9.
- Eltis, David; Bradley, Keith R.; Engerman, Stanley L.; Perry, Craig; Cartledge, Paul; Richardson, David; Drescher, Seymour (2021-08-12). The Cambridge World History of Slavery: Volume 2, AD 500-AD 1420. Cambridge University Press. ISBN 978-0-521-84067-5.
- Zysow, Aron (2014-06-23). The Economy of Certainty: An Introduction to the Typology of Islamic Legal Theory. Lockwood Press. ISBN 978-1-937040-27-7.
- Slavery and Other Forms of Strong Asymmetrical Dependencies: Semantics and Lexical Fields. Germany, De Gruyter, 2022.
- de la Puente, Cristina, Moukheiber, Karen and Tolino, Serena. Slavery and the Shaping of the Premodern Muslim Family, De Gruyter, 2026. https://doi.org/10.1515/9783112231227
