= Maria al-Qibtiyya =

Concubine of Muhammad

Maria bint Shamʿūn
- Born: Egypt
- Died: 637
- Era: Early Islamic era
- Title: Maria al-Qibtiyya
- Children: Ibrahim ibn Muhammad
- Father: Sham'un

Maria al-Qibtiyya better known as Māriyya al-Qibṭiyya or al-Qubṭiyya (Arabic: مارية القبطية), or Maria the Copt, died 637, was a Coptic Egyptian woman who along with her sister Sirin bint Shamun, was given as a slave to the Islamic prophet Muhammad as a gift in 628 by Al-Muqawqis, a Christian governor of Alexandria, during the territory's Sasanian occupation. It is a subject of speculation whether she married Muhammad or continued to be a concubine. She spent the rest of her life in Medina, and had a son, Ibrahim, with Muhammad. The son died in his infancy, aged 2, and she died almost five years later.

Al-Maqrizi says that she was a native of Hebenu a village located near Antinoöpolis.

== Biography ==
In the Islamic year 6 AH (627–628 CE), Muhammad is said to have had letters written to the great rulers of the Middle East, proclaiming the continuation of the monotheistic faith with its final messages and inviting the rulers to join. The purported texts of some of the letters are found in Muhammad ibn Jarir al-Tabari's History of the Prophets and Kings. Tabari writes that a deputation was sent to an Egyptian governor named as al-Muqawqis. Maria was a slave who was offered as a gift of goodwill to Muhammad in reply to his envoys inviting the governor of Alexandria to Islam.

Tabari recounts the story of Maria's arrival from Egypt:

In this year Hātib b. Abi Balta'ah came back from al-Muqawqis bringing Māriyah and her sister Sīrīn, his female mule Duldul, his donkey Ya'fūr, and sets of garments. With the two women al-Muqawqis had sent a eunuch, and the latter stayed with them. Hātib had invited them to become Muslims before he arrived with them, and Māriyah and her sister did so. The Messenger of God, peace and blessings of Allah be upon Him, lodged them with Umm Sulaym bt. Milhān. Māriyah was beautiful. The prophet sent her sister Sīrīn to Hassān b. Thābit and she bore him 'Abd al-Rahmān b. Hassān.

The death of Ibrahim caused Muhammad to weep.

=== Status as a wife or concubine ===
Like Rayhana bint Zayd, there is some debate between historians and scholars as to whether Mariyah ever became Muhammad's wife or remained a concubine.

Muhammad's earliest biographers, Ibn Ishaq, Ibn Sa'd, and al-Tabari mentioned Mariyah as Muhammad's wife in their sirah. Ibn Kathir also states in his sirah that Muhammad married Mariyah:

Maria al-Qibtiyya (may Allah be pleased with her) is said to have married the Prophet (peace and blessings of Allah be upon him) and certainly everyone gave her the same title of respect as the Prophet's wives, Umm al Muminin ('Mother of the Believers').

Muhammad must have come in contact with many of these Copts and listened to their stories. Muhammad's friendship to Christians of Coptic faith is reflected in many aspects of his life. He is known to have had cordial relations with the Negus of Abyssinia, as indicated by the fact that he advised his followers at a time of persecution to flee there. He married a Coptic wife named Mariya, and he is reported to have advised his followers to be especially kind to the Copts of Egypt, considering them his in-laws.

According to Sahih Al-Mustadrak ala al-Sahihayn:

It is reported from 'Abdullah al-Zubairi who said: that after this the Noble Prophet (ﷺ) married (tazawwaju) Mariah daughter of Sham'un. This is the same Mariyah who was sent by Maqauqis, the ruler of Alexandria to the Prophet as a gift.

Some Islamic scholars point to a different asbāb al-nuzūl ('circumstance of revelation') for the passage reproduced above, saying it was only caused by Muhammad drinking honey, as narrated in Sahih al-Bukhari by Muhammad's wife Aisha:

The Prophet (ﷺ) used to stay (for a period) in the house of Zaynab bint Jahsh (one of the wives of the Prophet ) and he used to drink honey in her house. Hafsa bint Umar and I decided that when the Prophet (ﷺ) entered upon either of us, she would say, "I smell in you the bad smell of Maghafir (a bad smelling raisin). Have you eaten Maghafir?" When he entered upon one of us, she said that to him. He replied (to her), "No, but I have drunk honey in the house of Zaynab bint Jahsh, and I will never drink it again."

An indication that she was a concubine is that when she bore her son to Muhammad, she was set free.

Ibn 'Abbas said: When Maria gave birth to Ibrahim the Messenger of Allah (ﷺ) said, 'Her son has set her free.'

There is also strong evidence that there was no living quarter for her in the proximity of the Prophet's Mosque. Only the wives of Muhammad had their quarters adjacent to one another in the proximity of his mosque at Medina. Maria was made to reside permanently in an orchard, some three kilometers from the mosque. Evidence that suggests she was a concubine is in the narration:

Anas said: The Messenger of Allah (ﷺ) had a female-slave (amat) with whom he had intercourse, but Aishah and Hafsah would not leave him alone until he said that she was forbidden for him. Then Allah, the Mighty and Sublime, revealed: "O Prophet! Why do you forbid (for yourself) that which Allah has allowed to you until the end of the Verse?"

The 'female-slave' referred to in this narration was Maria the Copt, as specified in a hadith attributed to Umar and classified as sahih by Ibn Kathir, which names her Umm Ibrahim (Arabic for '[the] mother of Ibrahim').

In a report from Ibn 'Abbas and 'Urwah b. al-Zubair concerning the same incident, Muhammad said to Hafsa:

I make you witness that I my concubine (surriyyati) is now forbidden unto me.

Al-Tabari lists Maria as both one of Muhammad's wives and his slave:

Mariyah the Copt was presented to the Messenger of God, given to him by al-Muqawqis, the ruler of Alexandria, and she gave birth to the Messenger of God's son Ibrahim. These were the Messenger of God's wifes.

though perhaps using "wife" in the sense of one whom Muhammad had relations with and who mothered his child:

The Prophet admired Umm Ibrahim ['Mother of Ibrahim', Mariyah's title], who was fair-skinned and beautiful. He lodged her in al-'Aliyah, at the property nowadays called of Umm Ibrahim. He used to visit her there and ordered her to veil herself, [but] he had intercourse with her by virtue of her being his property...

One hadith attributed to Mus'ab b. 'Abdullah al-Zubairi states that the two were married, though another rendering of the hadith by Mus'ab's nephew Zubair b. al-Bakkar makes no mention of marriage.

Abu ‘Ubaydah said about Muhammad:

He had four [concubines]: Mariyah, who was the mother of his son Ibraaheem; Rayhaanah; another beautiful slave woman whom he acquired as a prisoner of war; and a slave woman who was given to him by Zaynab bint Jahsh.

Ibn Qayyim al-Jawziyya is another scholar and biographer of Muhammad who writes a sirah called Zad al-Ma'ad where he mentioned Mariyah as a slave girl.

== See also ==
- List of non-Arab Sahaba
