= Hatib ibn Abi Balta'ah =

Companion (Sahabi) of Muhammad

Hatib Bin Abi Balta'ah (Arabic: حاطب بن أبي بلتعة) was one of the Companions of the Prophet. He was a veteran of the Battle of Badr and had participated in all the battles with Muhammad.

== Biography ==
Hatib was a well-built man, with a light beard, slightly stooped, tending towards short stature, and having thick fingers. He was sent by Muhammad with a letter to Al-Muqawqis, an Egyptian Coptic Christian official. He returned with gifts, including two slaves, Maria al-Qibtiyya and her sister Sirin. Hatib narrated hadiths from Muhammad, which were transmitted by his sons Abdul Rahman bin Hatib, Yahya bin Hatib, and Urwah bin Zubayr.

It was discovered that he had sent a secret letter to the Quraysh detailing Muhammad's movements. When confronted, he begged for understanding explaining that he had only hoped the Quraysh tribe would help protect his family who were residing in Mecca in return, because unlike other Companions his family did not have security as he did not have any blood ties with the Quraysh. While Umar ibn Khattab sought the Muhammad's permission to kill Balta'ah, Muhammad denied it and said: "No, he has witnessed Badr, and you do not know, perhaps Allah has looked upon the people of Badr and said, 'Do as you wish, for I have forgiven you.'". Hatib was then spared.

== Death ==
Hatib died in Al-Madinah in the year 651 CE, at the age of 65. Uthman ibn Affan led his funeral prayer. Upon his death, he left his sons 4,000 dinars, some dirhams, and a house and some other things.
