= Yaʽfūr =

Donkey used as a mount by the Islamic Prophet Muhammad

Yaʽfūr (also rendered Yaʽfoor, Yaʽfour, ʽUfayr, ʽOfayr, meaning "Deer" in Arabic) was a donkey used as a mount by the Islamic prophet Muhammad, who was said to have often ridden it without harness. There are many tales of this donkey but the most common would be that the donkey is recorded to have been a gift from the Byzantine governor of Egypt some time between 628 and 632 AD (8–11 AH). According to both Sunni and Shi'ite Islamic tradition, it had the power of speech and told Muhammad that it was the last of a line of donkeys ridden by prophets and was a descendant of the donkey ridden by Jesus in his triumphal entry into Jerusalem, which was also called Yaʽfūr. The tradition holds that Yaʽfūr committed suicide in despair after Muhammad died by throwing itself into a well, though these accounts are held to be unreliable in hadith studies. In the centuries after Muhammad's death, the donkey's name and symbolism was repeatedly adopted by Islamic religious figures and rulers.

== Gifting of Yaʽfūr ==
Yaʽfūr was one of several animals that Muhammad is said to have ridden; the others included a roan horse called Murtajaz ("Spontaneous"), a black horse called Sakb ("Swift"), a mule called Duldul ("Vacillating") and a camel called Kaswa ("Split-Ears"), who accidentally killed herself when she hit her head on the stone wall of a mosque some time after his death.

According to the Book of Gifts and Rarities (Kitab al-Hadaya wa'l-Tuhaf), an anonymous 11th century work, Yaʽfūr was presented to Muhammad by al-Muqawqis, the Byzantine governor of Egypt (possibly Cyrus of Alexandria, the Patriarch of Alexandria at the time). Muhammad had sent Muqawqis a letter inviting him to convert to Islam. In return, Muqawqis sent the donkey, the mule Duldul, four slave girls, a eunuch, a horse, 1000 mithqals of gold and quantities of Egyptian goods and articles. One of the slave girls, Maria al-Qibtiyya, a Coptic Christian, was kept by Muhammad for himself and bore him a short-lived son, Ibrahim. The donkey was no mean gift either, as Egyptian donkeys were known for their beauty and were used by wealthy merchants as a means of transportation.

== Yaʽfūr in hadith ==
The donkey is the subject of a hadith (an account of the sayings and deeds of Muhammad) which holds that it had the power of speech. According to one version, Muhammad asked the donkey what its name was, to which it replied "Yazīd bin Shihāb". He declined to call it this, instead giving it the name of Yaʽfūr (a name which, according to another Islamic tradition, was shared by the donkey ridden by Jesus during his triumphal entry into Jerusalem). The donkey is said to have declined the gift of a female companion.

Another account holds that it was the donkey that spoke first to Muhammad, telling him that it had formerly been owned by a Jew. It had been uncooperative with its previous owner, deliberately stumbling so as to make him fall off, and was often punished by having its food withheld and being beaten. According to the donkey's own account, it was the last of sixty generations of donkeys which had been used by prophets (including Jesus, Ezra and Balaam) as riding animals. The donkey was said to have told Muhammad that he was "the last of his lineage, for Muhammad was the last of the prophets, and that he had been waiting for him and had allowed no one else to mount him."

Muhammad was also said to have used Yaʽfūr as a messenger, sending it to fetch supplies from merchants at whose doors it knocked using its head. The donkey would give the merchant a token telling him to love or to respond to the Prophet of God. When Muhammad died, the grief-stricken donkey was said to have committed suicide by throwing itself down the well of Abū 'l-Haytham bin at-Tayyihān.

An alternative hadith transmitted in Syria holds that Yaʽfūr's colour was black rather than sandy, that its previous name was 'Amr rather than Yazīd or Ziyād, and that it was the last of seven siblings ridden by prophets, rather than being the last of a line of sixty donkeys.

These accounts, however, are regarded in hadith studies as being untruthful and their chain of attribution or isnād is seen as dubious. The 12th-century historian Abu'l-Faraj ibn al-Jawzi is quoted as saying, "May God curse the fabricator of this tradition!" Ibn Hibban considered it weak on the grounds of the source, Muhammad bin Mazyad, being unreliable.

== Political and religious legacy of Yaʽfūr ==
Followers of Shia Islam believed that the Mahdi, the prophesied redeemer of Islam, would make his appearance in the company of Yaʽfūr the donkey and Duldul the mule. In one uprising, a grey mule representing Duldul was paraded with a chair on its back for the Mahdi. In the lands where Sunni Islam was practised, Yaʽfūr was repeatedly invoked in political and religious events for centuries after Muhammad's death. Al-Aswad al-Ansi, a "false prophet" active in Yemen in the 7th century usurped one of Muhammad's own epithets, calling himself (or being called) the Sahib al-Himar, the "Master of the Ass". Likewise the 8th century Umayyad caliph Marwan II was nicknamed al-Himar, "the Ass". The early Fatimid Caliphate was nearly overthrown in the 10th century by the rebel Abu Yazid, known as the "Man on the Donkey", while in Morocco the 12th century founder of the Almohad movement, Ibn Tumart, insisted on riding a donkey.

In the wider context, the story of Muhammad's donkey can be seen in the light of such animals being seen as religiously significant in the Near and Middle East for thousands of years. Donkeys and asses were held by the ancient Israelites to have a special connection with the spirit world. This is illustrated in the story of Balaam and the angel in the Book of Numbers, in which the prophet's donkey sees an otherwise invisible angel and miraculously gains the power of speech. Samson, too, draws on the mystical power of the donkey by using an ass's jawbone – symbolic of the power of the donkey's voice – to slay a thousand Philistines, while asses and donkeys were integral to the stories of Jesus and David.

A traditional connection between prophets and donkeys also existed in pre-Islamic Arabia, where seers (known as kahins) were often associated with asses. Muhammad's arrival was said to have been prophesied by a Jew who spoke of "a man neither short nor tall, wrapped in a cloak, and riding an ass." The evil anti-Messiah al-Dajjal is also expected to appear on a giant white donkey, while Muhammad himself is widely reported to have warned of the infernal nature of a donkey's voice: "When you hear the bray of an ass, seek refuge with God from the devil."
