= Anjasha al-Hadi =

Servant of Muhammad

Anjasha al-Hadi (Arabic: أَنْجَشَةُ ٱلْهَادِي, romanized: Anjasha al-Hādī) was a servant or slave of Muhammad mentioned in the Hadiths. Anjasha is described in the sources as being black in skin color and was one of Muhammad's personal camel drivers. Muhammad put him in charge of the women of his family.

Al-Nasa'i attests that Anjasha was homosexual. There is also a claim that Anjasha was eventually evicted from Muhammad's living quarters because of his sexual orientation, but the isnad is weak, suggesting that this claim may have been fabricated.

== See also ==
- LGBT in Islam
- Islamic views on slavery
