= Duldul (mule) =

Prophet Mhummad's mule

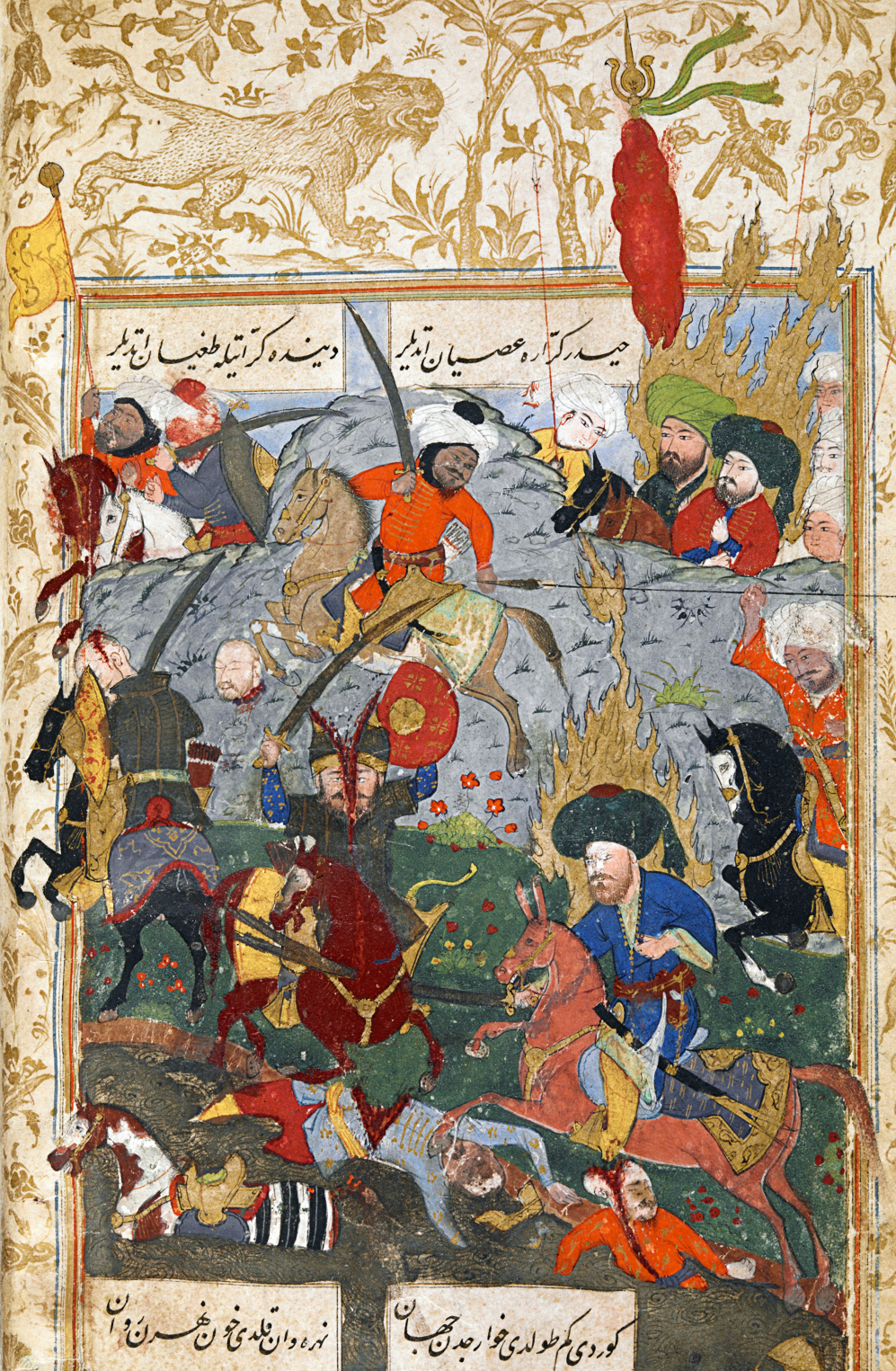
The Battle of Nahrawan between Ali and the Kharijites. Ali, mounted on Duldul, is wielding his double-bladed sword, Zulfiqar. A miniature painting from a manuscript of Maktel-i Ali Resul, a mesnevi poem on the martyrdom of Husayn ibn Ali. Created in Ottoman Turkey, late 16th or early 17th century

Duldul was a mule owned by the Islamic prophet Muhammad.

[Duldul was the] name of the white mule of the Prophet, which had been given to him by the Muḳawḳis [q.v.], at the same time as the ass called Yaʿfūr/ʿUfayr. After serving as his mount during his campaigns, she survived him and died at Yanbuʿ so old and toothless that in order to feed her the barley had to be put into her mouth. According to the S̲h̲īʿī tradition, ʿAlī rode upon her at the battle of the Camel and at Ṣiffīn.

She is an Alid symbol in Shia Islam. The first Safavid Emperor, Ismail I, rose to power as the leader of Kizilbash, antinomian Sufi warriors who were fervently Alid. Ismail, a noted poet under the pen name Hatayi, justified his own divine role as leader by variously writing that he himself is Ali's offspring; he is Ali himself; he possesses Zulfiqar, Duldul and ‘Ali's hat.

== See also ==
- Buraq
- Ya`fūr
- al-Muqawqis
- Zuljanah
