= Sirin bint Shamun =

Wife of Hasan ibn Thabit

Sīrīn bint Shamʿūn

Personal life
- Born: Egypt
- Died: Arabia
- Spouse: Hassan ibn Thabit
- Children: Abdurahman ibn Hassan
- Parent: Sham'un (father)
- Era: Early Islamic era
- Relatives: Maria al-Qibtiyya (sister)

Religious life
- Religion: Islam

Sīrīn bint Shamʿūn (Arabic: سيرين بنت شمعون) was an Egyptian Coptic Christian concubine, sent with her sister Maria al-Qibtiyya as gifts to the Islamic prophet Muhammad by the Egyptian official Muqawqis in 628.

According to the historian Ibn Saad, both sisters converted to Islam while on their way to Arabia with the encouragement of Hatib ibn Abi Balta'ah, who had been sent as a messenger to a governor of Egypt.

Sirin was married to the poet Hassan ibn Thabit, and bore him a son, Abdurahman ibn Hassan.

== Life ==
=== Coming to Medina ===
Sirin's father was a prominent figure among the Copts, as mentioned by Al-Muqawqis in his conversation with the messenger of Muhammad, and she was from the village of Hafn in the province of Minya in Upper Egypt. After the Treaty of Hudaybiyyah between Muhammad and the polytheists of Mecca, he ordered the writing of letters to the kings of the world inviting them to Islam. Among these kings was Al-Muqawqis, the ruler of Egypt under the Byzantine Empire.

When Muhammad sent a letter to Al-Muqawqis, the ruler of Alexandria and the representative of the Byzantine Empire in Egypt, he sent it with Hatib ibn Abi Balta'ah. Hatib took Muhammad's letter to Egypt and entered upon Al-Muqawqis, who welcomed him. As Hatib spoke, Al-Muqawqis listened attentively and then said to him, "O man, we have a religion that we will not abandon except for what is better than it." Al-Muqawqis was impressed by Hatib's words and said to him, "I have considered the matter of this Prophet and found that he does not enjoin anything reprehensible, nor does he prohibit anything desirable. I did not find him to be a misled sorcerer or a lying priest. With him, I found the signs of prophethood in his revelation of hidden secrets. I will consider further."

Al-Muqawqis sealed Muhammad's letter and wrote to him:

"In the name of Allah, the Most Gracious, the Most Merciful: To Muhammad ibn Abdullah, from Al-Muqawqis, the great of the Copts, peace be upon you. After this,

I have read your letter and understood its contents and your call. I have learned that a prophet remains, and I had thought he would emerge in Syria. I have honored your messenger, and I am sending you two of my maidservants who hold a high place among the Copts, along with garments, and I have sent you a mule for you to ride, peace be upon you."

The gift comprised two maidservants: Maria and her sister Serene. On their way back to Al-Madinah, Hatib offered Islam to them, and they embraced it.

== See also ==
- List of non-Arab Sahaba
- Sunni view of the Sahaba
