= Mukataba =

Islamic contract

In Islamic law, a mukataba (مكاتبة) is a contract of manumission between a master and a slave according to which the slave is required to pay a certain sum of money during a specific time period in exchange for freedom. In the legal literature, slaves who enter this contract are known as mukatab. The Ẓāhirī school of Islamic jurisprudence view it to be compulsory, while the Shafa'is, Malikis and Hanafis perceive it to be merely recommended, and mustahabb (praiseworthy) to do so. Mukataba is one of the four procedures provided in Islam for manumission of slaves.

== Scriptural References ==
=== Qur'an ===
The institution of mukataba is based on Qur'an^{[ 24:33]}:

And let those who do not have the means to marry keep themselves chaste until Allah enriches them out of His bounty. And if any of those ˹bondspeople˺ in your possession desires a deed of emancipation, make it possible for them, if you find goodness in them. And give them some of Allah’s wealth which He has granted you. Do not force your ˹slave˺ girls into prostitution for your own worldly gains while they wish to remain chaste. And if someone coerces them, then after such a coercion Allah is certainly All-Forgiving, Most Merciful ˹to them˺.

— Surah An-Nur 24:33

A slave identified as Subay referred to his master, Sayyidina Huwaytib bin Abdul Izza, for Kitaba, or a letter of manumission, and was promptly refused. The verse in question was thus revealed, and Huwaytib agreed to grant him emancipation if the slave offered him hundred dinars, twenty of which the former later remitted.

=== Hadith ===
Muhammad al-Bukhari, a major hadith collector, has two books concerning the manumission of a slave; Kitab al-'itq (the book on emancipation), and Kitab al-Mukataba (the book on contracts of manumission) with the latter narrating a single hadith six times with variance in the matn. The hadith concerns Barira - a slave girl inherited by the sons of Utba bin Abu Lahab - consulting Ayesha in need for payment of the kitaba. Ayesha argued that she could instead buy Barira and set her free herself in return for the latter's wala, but the men refused, stating the wala be for themselves. Muhammad confirmed Ayesha's beliefs.

Narrated 'Aishah (ra) that Barira came to seek her help writing of emancipation and she had to pay five Uqiya (of gold) by five yearly installments. 'Aishah said to her, "Do you think that if I pay the whole sum at once, your masters will sell you to me, and I will free you and your Wala' will be for me." Barira went to her masters and told them about that offer. They said that they would not agree to it unless her Wala' would be for them. 'Aishah further said, "I went to Allah's Messenger and told him about it." Allah Messenger said to her, "Buy Barira and manumit her and the Wala' will be for the liberator."

Bukhari makes mention of a slave known as Sirin, who owned some wealth, requesting emancipation from Musa bin Anas; who supposedly refused granting the contract. Umar, after being consulted by the slave, ordered that Musa was to be lashed, verbalizing the expression, "Give them such a contract if ye find any good in them."

Al-Bukhari said: “Rawh narrated from Ibn Jurayj: `I said to `Ata’, “If I know that my servant has money, is it obligatory for me to write him a contract of emancipation” He said, “I do not think it can be anything but obligatory” `Amr bin Dinar said: “I said to `Ata’, `Are you narrating this from anybody’ He said, `No,’ then he told me that Musa bin Anas told him that Sirin, who had a lot of money, asked Anas for a contract of emancipation and he refused. So he went to `Umar (bin Al-Khattab), may Allah be pleased with him, and he said, `Write it for him.’ He refused, so `Umar hit him with his whip and recited, (give them such writing, if you find that there is good and honesty in them.) Then he wrote the contract”

Ibn Kathir believes Bukhari's narration is disconnected, but Abdur Razzaq's one to be Saheeh. The following changes were added in the latter one: "Ibn Jarir recorded that Sirin wanted Anas bin Malik to write a contract of emancipation and he delayed, then `Umar said to him, 'You should certainly write him a contract of emancipation.'"

== Islamic Law ==
=== Early Islam ===
According to Joseph Schacht, those who were hearing Muhammad pronouncing this verse "were supposed to know the details of the transaction referred to, and the strictest interpretation of the passage suggests that it was not identical with the contract of manumission by mukataba such as was elaborated later by the ancient lawyers in the second century of Islam." The earliest interpretation of the verse suggested that the mukatab became free after paying one-half of the agreed amount. Another early decision attributed to the Meccan scholar Ata ibn Rabi Rabah was that the slave acquired liberty having paid three-quarters. The doctrine of an early school of Islamic jurisprudence based in Kufa held that the mukatab became free as soon as he paid off his value; other contemporaneous opinions were that the mukatab became free pro rata with the payments or that he became free immediately after concluding the contract, the payments to his master being ordinary debts. Finally the view of the Kufan scholars prevailed, and according to Schacht, the hadith supporting this position were put into circulation; first they were projected to Muhammad's companions and later to Muhammad himself.

=== Obligation upon master to grant the contract ===
There is debate amongst scholars regarding the obligation upon the master to grant this contract. The Ẓāhirī school of Islamic jurisprudence view it to be compulsory, while the Shafa'is, Malikis and Hanafis perceive it to be merely recommended, and praise-worthy to do so. Abul A'la Maududi says: A group of jurists have interpreted this as “execute the deed of emancipation with them”, that it is obligatory for the owner to accept the offer of a slave to earn his emancipation. This is the view of Ata, Amr bin Dinar Ibn Sirin, Masruq, Dahhak, Ikrimah, the Zahiriyyah and Ibn Jarir Tabari, and Imam Shafai also favoured it in the beginning. The other group holds that it is not obligatory but only recommendatory and commendable. This group includes jurists like Shabi, Muqatil bin Hayyan, Hasan Basri, Abdul Rahman bin Zaid, Sufyan Thauri, Abu Hanifah and Malik bin Anas and Imam Shafai later on also had adopted this view.

Maududi highlights the affirmation regarding the obligation by citing the Ahadith recounted by Abdur Razzaq and Bukhari in reference to a slave mentioned as Sirin, who owned some wealth, requesting emancipation from Musa bin Anas; who supposedly refused granting the contract. Umar, after being consulted by the slave, ordered that Musa was to be lashed, verbalizing the expression, "Give them such a contract if ye find any good in them." Maududi states that the argument against this proposes that only one incident was insufficient to be declared as evidence for such a claim. He retorts that, "All that can be said is that Umar, apart from his position of a judge, was like a father to the Muslims and might have used his paternal authority in a matter where he could not intervene as a judge.

Maududi claims that the phrase, "if ye know any good in them:" renders this as upon the master to decide due to its subjectivity, and a lack of fix standard as to what qualifies as "good." Ashiq Ilahi cites Umar bin Dinar and Sayiddana Ali as being proponents for the first part of the verse,"give them such a deed," as using imperative tone, hence making it compulsory. He states that Dur al-Manthur credited the hadith mentioned in Abu Dawud and Bayhaqi, which included Muhammad defining "good" as reference to one's skill and qualifications for labour and also hinting there being an implication of it simply forbidding the slave be compelled to beg. He claims that the hadith also mentions that Allah will aid the slave in paying his debt, henceforth the former must focus on earning halal income. Ibn Kathir summarizes this up like this: This is a command from Allah to slave-owners: if their servants ask them for a contract of emancipation, they should write for them, provided that the servant has some skill and means of earning so that he can pay his master the money that is stipulated in the contract.

=== The Mukatib ===
There are two different views of mukataba among scholars causing a divergence in the details: some call mukataba as a "conditional enfranchisement", while others see it as "ransom by the slave of his own person". Jurists usually disapprove of entering a mukataba with a female slave with no honest source of income. The majority of Sunni authorities approved the manumission of all the "People of the Book", that is, Christians and Jews, but according to some jurists, especially among the Shi’a, only Muslim slaves should be liberated.

According to the opinion of a majority of Muslim jurists, the slave must pay the agreed-upon amount in instalments. The followers of Hanafi school of Islamic jurisprudence accept one immediate payment; scholars of the Maliki school require one instalment, while Hanbalis and Shafi'is insist on at least two instalments. The slaves were allowed to either work independently and apply their earnings for their ransom, or to work for the master. Having given his consent the owner was not permitted to change his mind, although the slave had such an option. In the event the slave became delinquent in meeting the payments, he was obliged to return to unqualified servitude, with the master keeping the money already paid him. At the end of the payments, a rebate is usually given to the slave in compliance with 24:33. The amount of the rebate depending on the authorities can be "fixed or discretionary, obligatory or merely recommended".

The emancipation of a mukatab occurs only when he has paid to the master the agreed amount in full. The contract may be revoked when the slave defaults on one of the payments. The mukatab may receive the proceeds from the Islamic charity (zakat), but he is not entitled to them. When the mukatab makes the final payment, he is entitled to a rebate, in compliance with the Qur'anic text. Islamic authorities disagree as to whether the rebate is obligatory or merely recommended and whether its sum is fixed or discretionary. After manumission, the slave liberated through mukataba remains a client (mawali) of his former master.

Most Muslim scholars forbid selling the slave after concluding the mukataba; the Hanbalis, who disagree with this view, maintain that the purchaser inherits the obligation to liberate the mukatab under the terms of the contract of enfranchisement. The owner cannot marry a mukatab without his or her consent. Islamic law prohibits concubinage with a female slave who has concluded a mukataba.

== See also ==
- Islamic views on slavery
- Slavery
