= Hassan ibn Thabit =

Arabian poet and Companion of Muhammad

Hassan ibn Thabit حسان بن ثابت

Personal life
- Born: c. 564 CE Yathrib, Hejaz, Arabia
- Died: 674 (aged 110–111) Medina, Umayyad Caliphate
- Spouse: Sirin bint Shamun
- Children: Abdul-Rahman ibn Hassan
- Occupation: Poet
- Relations: Banu Khazraj (from Azd)

Religious life
- Religion: Islam

Hassan ibn Thabit (Arabic: حسان بن ثابت) (born c. 563, Medina died 674) was an Arabian poet and one of the companions of the Islamic prophet Muhammad, who was best known for poems in defense of the prophet.

He was born in Medina, and was a member of the Banu Khazraj tribe. He was married to a woman, Sirin, who was the sister of the Prophet Muhammad's wife, Maria al-Qibtiyya.

His writings in defense of Muhammad refer to contemporary events that have been useful in documenting the period. He was also Islam's first religious poet.

== Life ==
According to Islamic tradition Ḥassān lived for 120 years, sixty years before converting to Islam and another sixty thereafter. In his youth he traveled to Al-Hirah and Damascus, then he settled in Medina, where, after Muhammad's arrival, he accepted Islam and wrote poems in his defense.

== Poetic Career ==
Hassan bin Thabit wrote more than two thousand satires and elegies. He is said to have written about 1,000 poems of three to twenty lines. Those poems were composed satirizing Abu Sufyan, Ibn al-Jibara, Amr bin al-Ās, Hatim bin Hisham and Abu Jahl. He belittled them by comparing them to monkeys, goats, ostriches, and foxes.

== Death ==
Hassan bin Thabit died in Al-Madinah between the years 655 and 661 and during the caliphate of Ali ibn Abi Talib at the age of around 120. Some historians suggest that Hassan bin Thabit died during the caliphate of Muawiyah ibn Abi Sufyan between the years 670 and 674.

== Legacy ==
The Palestinian poet Salim Al-Ya'qubi titled himself as "Hassan of Palestine" and chose it as a literary pseudonym. Imam Ahmed Raza Khan Al Hanafi Al Maturidi also known as Hassanul Hind.

== See also ==
- Hasan (name)
- Thabit (name)
