= Kecia Ali =

American scholar of Islam (born 1972)

- Born: 1972 (age 53–54)
- Education: BA Stanford University, MA, PhD Duke University
- Occupation: Scholar of Islam
- Website: bu.edu/religion/people/faculty/bios/kecia-ali/

Kecia Ali (born 1972) is an American scholar of Islam who focuses on the study of Islamic jurisprudence, ethics, women and gender, and biography. She is currently a professor of religion at Boston University. She previously worked with Brandeis University's Feminist Sexual Ethics Project, presided over the Society for the Study of Muslim Ethics and was a research associate and postdoctoral fellow at Brandeis University and Harvard Divinity School.

== Education ==
Ali received her BA at Stanford University in History and Feminist Studies in 1993. Then, in 2000, she received her M.A. in Religion and in 2002 her Ph.D. in Religion both at Duke University. She converted to Islam while in college.

== Work ==
Ali has written relating to the topic of marriage, womanhood, and their connection with, and development alongside, Islam. She is sensitive to the way the Western World perceives women in Islam and says that in Islamic studies "Issues of gender are very much on everybody's minds."

Sexual Ethics and Islam: Feminist Reflections on Qur'an, Hadith, and Jurisprudence was called a "challenging contribution" to Islamic history by Comparative Islamic Studies. Ali talks about controversial topics such as marriage, divorce, sex, concubinage, same-sex intimacy, and much more.

Ali has since published an anniversary addition of Sexual Ethics and Islam. This 2016 edition supplements the existing chapters with a Coda to further expand on topics previously addressed.

Marriage and Slavery in Early Islam was called a "meticulous, pellucid, authoritative and very focused survey of early Islamic marriage law" by the Journal of the American Academy of Religion. The Journal of Law & Religion calls Marriage and Slavery a "valuable contribution to the fields of legal, historical and gender studies."The Lives of Muhammad was reviewed favorably by Publishers Weekly.

== Publications ==
=== Books ===
Her major works include:

- Sexual Ethics and Islam: Feminist Reflections on Qur'an, Hadith, and Jurisprudence (2006; expanded ed. 2016).
- Marriage and Slavery in Early Islam (2010).
- Imam Shafi‘i: Scholar and Saint (2011).
- A Jihad for Justice: Honoring the Work and Life of Amina Wadud (2012) (co-edited with Juliane Hammer and Laury Silvers).
- The Lives of Muhammad (2014).
- Human in Death: Morality and Mortality in J.D. Robb's Novels (2017).
- Women in Latin America and the Caribbean (co-authored with ...).
- Islam: The Key Concepts (2007) (co-authored with Oliver Leaman).
