= Al-Muqawqis =

Ruler of Egypt during the time of Muhammad

Al-Muqawqis (Arabic: المقوقس, Coptic: ⲡⲭⲁⲩⲕⲓⲁⲛⲟⲥ, ⲡⲓⲕⲁⲩⲕⲟⲥ, romanized: p-khaukianos, pi-kaukos, lit. 'man of the Caucasus') is mentioned in Muslim history as a ruler of Egypt who corresponded with Muhammad. He is widely identified with the last prefect of Egypt, Cyrus of Alexandria, who was the Greek Orthodox Patriarch of Alexandria of the second era of Byzantine Egypt (628-642).

When being presented with the letter of invitation to Islam by Muhammad, he said he couldn’t risk his kingdom, therefore not accepting Islam. He sent the messenger back with several gifts, including two slave-girls named Mariyya and Seereen; the former of whom became the mother of the prophet Muhammad's son, Ibrahim.

== Account by Muslim historians ==
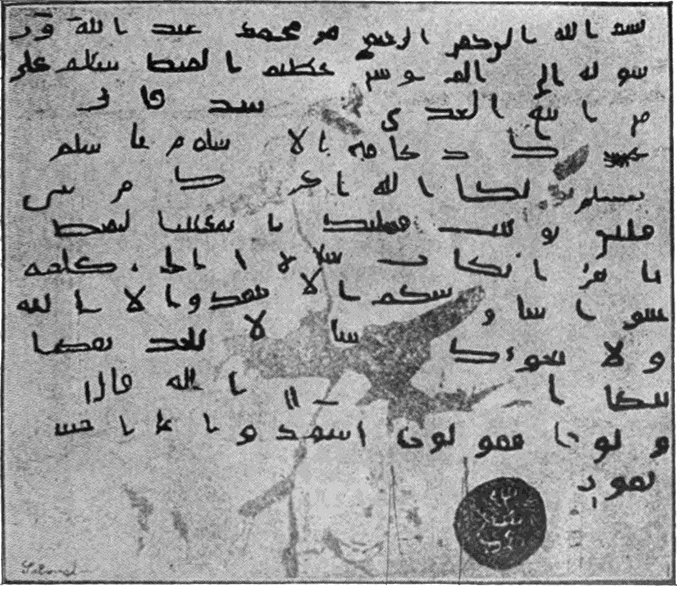
Muhammad's Letter to Muqauqis discovered in Egypt in 1858.

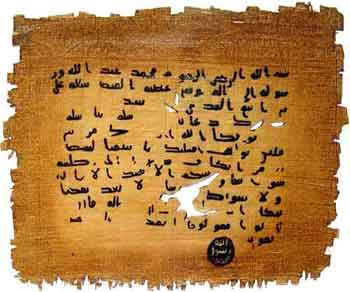
Muhammad's Letter to Muqauqis discovered in Egypt in 1858 (colored version).

Ibn Ishaq and other Muslim historians record that sometime between February 628 and 632, Muhammad sent epistles to the political heads of Medina's neighboring regions, both in the Arabian Peninsula and the Near East, including to al-Muqawqis:

[Muhammad] had sent out some of his companions in different directions to the kings [recte sovereigns] of the Arabs and the non-Arabs inviting them to Islam in the period between al-Ḥudaybiya and his death...[he] divided his companions and sent...Ḥāṭib b. Abū Baltaʿa to the Muqauqis ruler of Alexandria. He handed over to him the...

Al-Tabari states that the delegation was sent in Dhu al-Hijja in the sixth hijri year (April or May 628). Ibn Sa'd states that the Muqawqis sent his gifts to Muhammad in 7 A.H. (after May 628). This is consistent with his assertion that Maria al-Qibtiyya bore Muhammad's son Ibrahim in late March or April 630, so Maria had arrived in Medina before July 629.

== Letter of invitation to Islam ==
The epistle that Muhammad sent to al-Muqawqis, through his emissary Hatib ibn Abi Balta'ah, and his reply are both available.

بسم الله الرحمن الرحيم، من محمد عبد الله و رسوله إلى المقوقس عظيم القبط: سلام على من اتبع الهدى، وأما بعد فإني أدعوك بدعاوية الإسلام، أسلم تسلم يؤتك الله أجرك مرتين، فإن توليت فعليك إثم القبط و{يَآ أَهْلَ الْكِتٰبِ تَعَالَوْا إِلٰى كَلِمَةٍ سَوَآءٍ بَيْنَنَا وَبَيْنَكُمْ أَلَّا نَعْبُدَ إِلَّا اللهَ وَلَا نُشْرِكَ بِهٖ شَيْئًا وَّلَا يَتَّخِذَ بَعْضُنَا بَعْضًا أَرْبَابًا مِنْ دُونِ اللهِ فَإِنْ تَوَلَّوْا فَقُولُوا اشْهَدُوا بِأَنَّا مُسْلِمُونَ}
In the name of God, the Gracious One, the Merciful
From Muhammad, servant of God and His apostle to al-Muqawqis, premier of Egypt:
Peace unto whoever followeth the guided path!
And thereafter, I verily call thee to the call of Submission [to God] ("Islam"). Submit (i.e., embrace Islam) and be safe [from perdition, as] God shall compensate thy reward two-folds. But if thou turn away, then upon thee will be the guilt [of delusion] of the Egyptians.
Then "O People of the Scripture, come to a term equitable between us and you that we worship none but God and associate [as partners in worship] with Him nothing, and we take not one another as Lords apart from God. [Then God says] But if they turn away, then say: Bear witness that we are Submitters [to God] ("Muslims").

The epistle was signed with the seal of Muhammad.

Al-Muqawqis ordered that the letter be placed in an ivory casket to be kept safely in the government treasury. The letter was found in an old Christian monastery among Coptic books in the town of Akhmim, Egypt and now resides in the Topkapi Palace Museum's Department of Holy Relics after the Ottoman sultan Abdülmecid I brought it to Istanbul. Al-Muqawqis is said to have replied with a letter that read:

بسم الله الرحمن الرحيم، لمحمد بن عبد الله من المقوقس عظيم القبط، سلام عليك، أما بعد فقد قرأت كتابك، وفهمت ما ذكرت فيه، وما تدعو إليه، وقد علمت أن نبيا قد بقي، وقد كنت أظن أنه يخرج بالشام، وقد أكرمت رسولك، وبعثت إليك بجاريتين لهما مكان في القبط عظيم وبثياب، وأهديت إليك بغلة لتركبها، والسلام عليك
In the name of God, the Gracious One, the Merciful
To Muhammad son of Abd-Allah from al-Muqawqis, premier of Egypt:
Peace unto thee!
Thereafter, I have already read thy letter, and comprehended what thou mentioned therein and what thou called me to. I have known that a prophet is still due [to come] but I thought he would emerge in the Levant (aš-Šām).
I have already treated with dignity thy messenger, and I am sending to thee two slave-girls whose position in Egypt is great, and [also] clothes, and I am sending as gifts to thee a she-mule for thee to ride. Then [I end here:] Peace unto thee!

The two slave-girls mentioned are Maria al-Qibtiyya, whom Muhammad married, and her sister Sirin bint Shamun, whom Hassan ibn Thabit married.

It is said that a recluse in the monastery pasted it on his Bible and from there a French Orientalist obtained it and sold it the Sultan for £300. The authenticity of the preserved sample and the elaborate accounts by medieval Islamic historians regarding the events surrounding the letter have also been questioned by modern historians.

== Explanation of the name ==
The word muqawqis is the Arabized form of Coptic ⲡⲓⲕⲁⲩⲕⲟⲥ, meaning "the man from the Caucasus," an epithet among the Copts for the Melchite patriarch Cyrus, who was seen as a corrupt and foreign usurper of Pope Benjamin I of Alexandria. The word was subsequently used by Arab writers for some other patriarchs in Alexandria such as George I of Alexandria (Jurayj ibn Mīnā "Georgios son of Menas Parkabios"; alternatively, "Jurayj ibn Mattá").

== Film and television depictions ==
- Al-Muqawqis was portrayed by Egyptian actor Salah Zulfikar in Muhammad, Messenger of Allah to the World, TV series aired on Egyptian TV in 1993.
