= Tamara Sonn =

American academic

Tamara Sonn is an American academic who specializes in Islamic and religious studies. She is currently the Hamad Bin Khalifa Al-Thani Professor Emerita in the History of Islam at Georgetown University. She was previously Kenan Professor of Religion and Humanities at the College of William & Mary. Tamara also taught International Studies at St. John Fisher College in Rochester, N.Y.

Sonn received a B.A. in philosophy from Santa Clara University, an M.A. in philosophy from the University of Toronto, and a Ph.D. in Near Eastern languages and civilizations from the University of Chicago, where she studied under Fazlur Rahman.

Sonn is the author of the book A Brief History of Islam, written in 2004. In the book, she argues against violence and inequality for women under Islamic law; and commends Morocco's Mudawana family code for the abolishment of the patriarchal family and diction respecting women.

The United States Institute of Peace and the American Council of Learned Societies have funded her work through grants. She is on the board of directors of the American Council for the Study of Islamic Societies, previously as Vice President of the Eastern Division of the American Academy of Religion, and associate editor of the Middle East Studies Association Bulletin, Muslim World and the American Journal for Islamic Social Science.

== Bibliography ==
- Tamara Sonn (1990). Between Qur'an and Crown: The Challenge of Political Legitimacy in the Arab World (1st ed.). New York: Routledge. p. 280. doi:10.4324/9780429042041. ISBN 9780429042041.
- Tamara Sonn (1996). Interpreting Islam: Bandali Jawzi's Islamic Intellectual History (1st ed.). Oxford University Press. ISBN 9780195100518.
- Tamara Sonn, ed. (1996). Islam and the Question of Minorities. South Florida-Rochester-St. Louis Studies in Religion and the Social Order. University of South Florida. ISBN 9780788503092.
- Jacob Neusner, Tamara Sonn (1999). Comparing Religions Through Law: Judaism and Islam (1st ed.). London: Routledge. p. 280. doi:10.4324/9780203202678. ISBN 9780203202678.
- Jonathan E. Brockopp, Jacob Neusner, Tamara Sonn (2000). Judaism and Islam in Practice: A Sourcebook. Routledge. ISBN 9780415216746.
- Tamara Sonn (2010). Islam: A Brief History. Blackwell Brief Histories of Religion Series (2nd ed.). Wiley-Blackwell. ISBN 9781405180931.
- Tamara Sonn (2016). Is Islam an Enemy of the West?. Global Futures. Polity Press. p. 152. ISBN 9781509504411.
