= Battle of Autas =

630 military conflict in the early Muslim period

- Part of the military campaigns of Muhammad
| Date | 630 C.E. |
| Location | Autas, Hejaz, present-day Saudi Arabia |
| Result | Muslim victory |

Belligerents
| First Islamic state | Thaqif; Hawazin; Hilal |

Commanders and leaders
| Muhammad; Khalid ibn al-Walid | Malik ibn Awf |

Strength
| 12,000 | Unknown |

Casualties and losses
| few | notable |

The Battle of Autas or Awtas (Arabic: غَزْوَة أَوْطَاس, romanized: Ġazwat Awṭās) took place in 630 C.E. between the forces of the Islamic prophet Muhammad and the tribal coalition centered around Taif. It was an immediate follow-up engagement following the victory at the Battle of Hunayn.

== Background ==
After the conquest of Mecca by the Muslims, the conflict between Mecca and Ta'if which had been kept at the low for so long finally unveiled itself. Under Malik b. Awf, a coalition of consisting of Thaqif, Hawazin and their allies prepared to take the offensive against Muhammad and his troops. They met at the valley of Hunayn where they were soon sent into a retreat.

== Battle ==
After the victory at Hunayn, Muhammad advanced on with his force of 12,000 men into Autas, pursuing remnants of the defeated Hawazin-Thaqif coalition. The opposition was already weakened and scattered, and although some resistance was offered, it quickly collapsed under the weight of the Muslim pursuit. Several enemy leaders and warriors were killed, many making their way towards Ta'if, where they would help to defend against the well-known siege that followed. Autas thus served as a finish-up operation and as part of the Hunayn Campaign, rather than a detached and independent battle.

== Aftermath ==
The clash yielded significant spoils of war. Large numbers of livestock, prisoners and weapons fell into Muslim hands. These captives and spoils were distributed in Ji'rana among his allies, solidifying loyalty in the disaffected and new converts. The victory at Autas reinforced Muslim dominance in the Hijaz, broke the strength of the Hawazin alliance, and accelerated the submission of surrounding tribes. Within weeks, many tribal leaders who had fought at Hunayn sought reconciliation with Muhammad and the release of their captives, either by sending delegations or by joining him at Ji'rana.

== See also ==
- Military career of Muhammad
- List of expeditions of Muhammad
- Battle of Hunayn
- Siege of Ta'if
