= Expedition of Abu Musa Al-Ashari =

Date	January 630 AD or 8 AH, 10th month, of the Islamic Calendar
Location	Autas
Result	Killers of Abu Amir killed; Men women and children captured, war booty captured

Commanders and leaders
Abu Musa al-Ash'ari	Unknown

Strength
Unknown	Unknown

Casualties and losses
None	Enemy killed (Tabari) Some captured

The Expedition of Abu Musa Al-Ashari, took place in January 630 AD or 8AH, 10th month, of the Islamic Calendar, in Autas.

After Abu Amir was ordered to chase the enemies who fled the Battle of Hunayn, he was killed in the expedition, his nephew Abu Musa then pursued the killers and killed them, and captured others.

== Background ==
Muhammad ordered Abu Amir al-Ashari to chase the enemies who fled during the Battle of Hunayn, Abu Musa (who is Abu Amir's nephew was among them). Abu Amir chased them but was killed in the expedition. The standard was then taken by Abu Musa Al-Ashari who became the commander of the army battalion.

== Expedition ==
Abu Musa chased the enemy and killed them. He also captured captives, men, women and children, as well as war booty.

The event is mentioned by the Muslim Jurist Muhammad ibn Jarir al-Tabari as follows:

The Messenger of God sent me with Abu ' Amir. When Abu ' Amir was hit by an arrow, which stuck in his knee, shot by a man from the Banu Jusham, I came to him and said, "O uncle, who shot you?" Pointing to the man, he said, "That one is my killer! You see him, that one shot me!" Abu Musa went after him and overtook him, but when the man saw him he fled.

Abu Musa pursued him, calling out [loudly], "Aren't you ashamed of (yourself)? Aren't you an Arab? Won't you make a stand?" So he turned back. They confronted each other and exchanged two blows. Abu Musa killed him with his sword and returned to Abu ' Amir telling him that God had killed his enemy. Abu 'Amir asked him to remove the arrow [from his knee], and when he removed it water flowed from [the wound]....

He then appointed Abu Musa in charge of the Army and died shortly thereafter

[Tabari, The Last Years of the Prophet, Pg 17]

The event is also mentioned in the Sunni Hadith collections Sunan Abu Dawood, 31:6092 and Sahih al-Bukhari, 5:59:612.

== See also ==
- Military career of Muhammad
- List of expeditions of Muhammad
