= Al-Ji'rana =

Al-Jiʿrānah ٱلْجِعْرَانَة
- Village
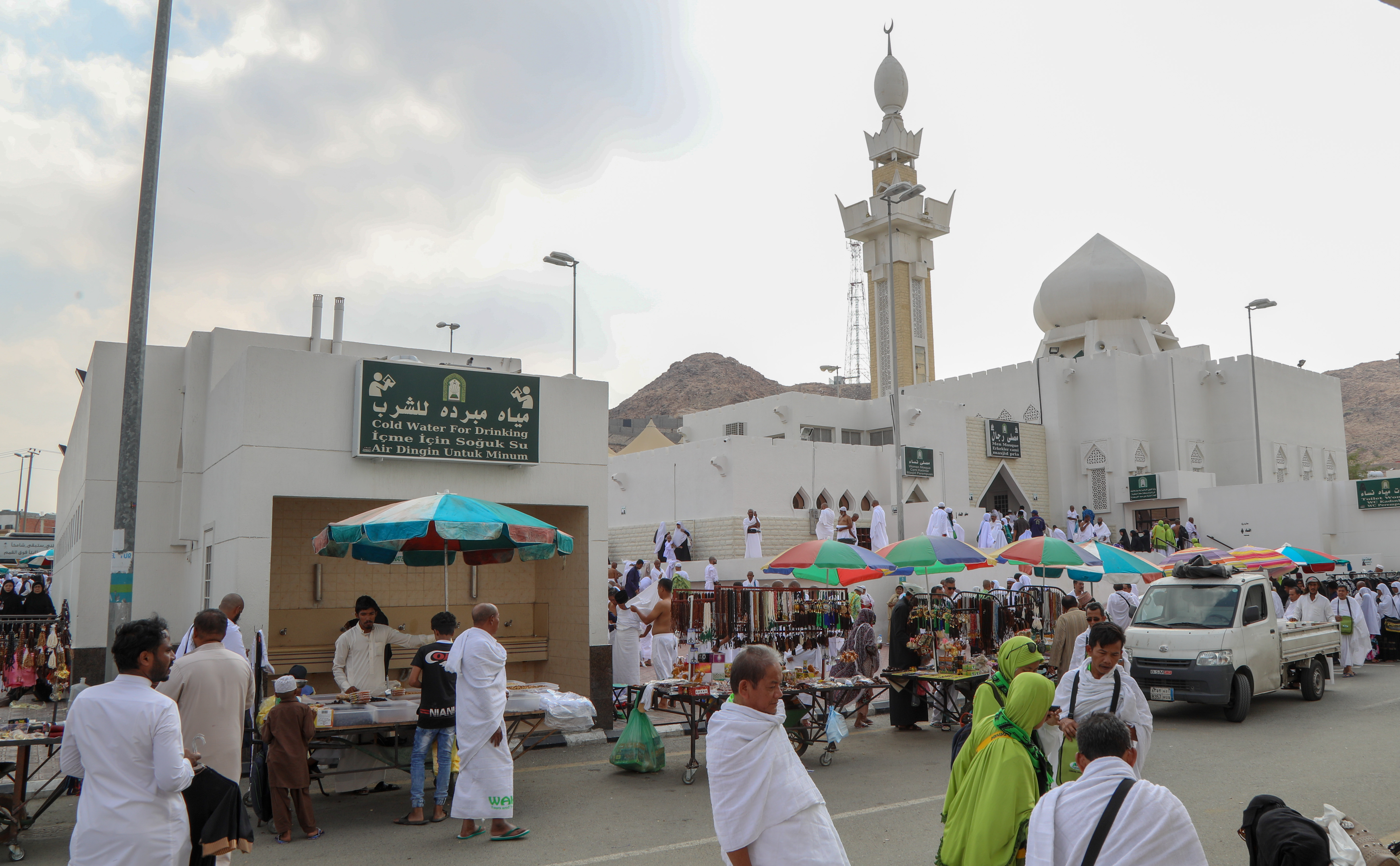
- Masjid Al-Jiʿrānah

- Location in Saudi Arabia Al-Jiʿrānah (Middle East) Al-Jiʿrānah (West and Central Asia)
- Coordinates: 21°34′N 39°57′E
- Country: Saudi Arabia
- Province: Makkah
- Time zone: UTC+3 (EAT)
  - Summer (DST): UTC+3 (EAT)

Al-Ji'rana (Arabic: ٱلْجِعْرَانَة, romanized: Al-Jiʿrānah) is a village in Mecca Province, in western Saudi Arabia. A boundary of the Haram, it is located 18 miles (29 kilometres) northeast of Mecca.

== Description ==
It was here in the 7th century that the Islamic prophet Muhammad distributed spoils of war among his allies, after the battles of Hunain and Autas, and before the siege of Ta'if.

Al-Ji'rana was mentioned by the 8th-century Arab historian Al-Waqidi. In his Kitab al-Tarikh wa al-Maghazi ("Book of History and Campaigns"), Al-Waqidi describes two ancient sanctuaries in al-Ji'rana visited by Muhammad on his journey on dhu al-qa'da of the eighth year after the Hijrah: al-masjid al-aqṣā ("the farthest mosque") and al-masjid al-adnā ("the closest mosque"). This was also mentioned by Al-Azraqi, a 9th-century Islamic commentator and historian.

According to the Qur'an, Muhammad was transported to a site named al-masjid al-ʾaqṣā ("the furthest place of prayer") during his Night Journey. The Qur'an does not mention the exact location of "the furthest place of prayer". The actual meaning of the phrase is debated in both early Islamic and contemporary sources. According to the Encyclopaedia of Islam, the term was originally understood as a reference to a site in the heavens. Another group of Islamic scholars understood the story of Muhammad's ascension from Al-Aqsa Mosque as relating to Jerusalem. Eventually, a consensus emerged around the identification of the "furthest place of prayer" with Jerusalem, and by implication the Temple Mount.

In 1953, British Islamic scholar Alfred Guillaume suggested that Al-Ju'ranah was the location of Al-Aqsa described in the Qur'an as the destination of Muhammad's Night Journey. He based his theory on the writings of Al-Waqidi and Al-Azraqi. In 1959, French art historian Oleg Grabar wrote this theory was convincing. This theory has received backing from Youssef Ziedan, Mordechai Kedar, Yitzhak Reiter, and Suleiman al-Tarawneh in recent years. These historians also support the view according which the Umayyad dynasty's political objectives contributed to the sanctification of Jerusalem in Islam, as they sought to compete with the religious importance of Mecca, which was then ruled by their rival, Abd Allah ibn al-Zubayr. The theory has been criticized as a "claim [which] merely consists of subjective interpretations".

In November 2020, Saudi lawyer Osama Yamani promoted this theory in an opinion article in the Saudi newspaper Okaz. The article sparked outrage from Muslims around the world, with some writers claiming it was fabricated to justify the decision of some Gulf countries to normalize ties with Israel.

== See also ==
- Arabian Peninsula
  - Regions of Saudi Arabia
    - Hunain Valley
    - Awtas
