= Hunayn, Saudi Arabia =

Ḥunayn حُنَيْن وَادِي حُنَيْن
- Locality
- Flag Coat of arms
- Nickname: Wādī Ḥunayn
- Location in Saudi Arabia Ḥunayn (Middle East) Ḥunayn (West and Central Asia)
- Coordinates: 21°26′N 40°21′E
- Country: Saudi Arabia
- Province: Makkah
- Established: The 6th century

Government
  - Provincial Governor: Meshal bin Abdullah Al Saud
- Elevation: 1,879 m (6,165 ft)
- Time zone: UTC+3 (Arabian Standard Time)

The Valley of Hunain (Arabic: وَادِي حُنَيْن, romanized: Wādī Ḥunayn) is a location in western Saudi Arabia, close to the city of Taif. It is located between Mecca and Taif in the Sarawat Mountains.

== Description ==
The location, on the road from Mecca to Taif, is a wide arid wadi (valley) surrounded by barren, rocky mountains. The Battle of Hunayn took place here.

== See also ==
- Middle East
  - Arabian Peninsula
    - Al-Ji'ranah
    - Awtas
    - Badr, Saudi Arabia
  - Wadi Hunayn, Ash-Shaam
