= Expedition of Abu Amir Al-Ashari =

Date	January 630 AD or 8 AH, 10th month, of the Islamic Calendar
Location	Autas
Result	Abu Amir Al-Ashari killed

Commanders and leaders
Abu Amir al-Ash'ari †; Abu Musa al-Ash'ari	Durayd ibn al-Simma

Strength
Unknown	Unknown

Casualties and losses
1 killed	9 killed (Tabari)

The expedition of Abu Amir Al-Ashari, took place in January 630 AD or 8AH, 10th month, of the Islamic Calendar, in Autas.

== Expedition ==
In this expedition, Muhammad dispatched a number of Muslims under the leadership of Abu ‘Amir Al-Ashari. The Muslims chased the enemy, after which a skirmish took place, and the leader of the platoon, Abu Amir was killed.

== Islamic primary sources ==
The event is mentioned by the Muslim Jurist Muhammad ibn Jarir al-Tabari as follows:

Ibn Hisham, Sirah, IV, 99-100, states that he was shot by two brothers, al-'Ala' and Awfa, sons of al-Harith from the Banu Jusham b. Mu'awiyah. One arrow hit his heart, while the other hit his knee. Abu Musa attacked and killed both of them. Ibn Hisham adds another note describing Abu 'Amir's bravery and states that he was challenged to a duel by ten men, all of them brothers. Abu 'Amir accepted the challenge, killed nine of them and allowed the tenth, who later became a Muslim, to escape. Waqidi, Maghazi, III, 915-16, reports a similar story and states that Abu 'Amir killed nine contestants but was killed by the tenth .Ibn Sa' Tabaqat, II/I,109

[Tabari, The Last Years of the Prophet, Pg 17]

The event is mentioned in the Sunni Hadith collection, Sahih al-Bukhari as follows:

Narrated Abu Musa: When the Prophet had finished from the battle of Hunain, he sent Abu Amir at the head of an army to Autas He (i.e. Abu Amir) met Duraid bin As Summa and Duraid was killed and Allah defeated his companions. The Prophet sent me with Abu 'Amir. Abu Amir was shot at his knee with an arrow which a man from Jushm had shot and fixed into his knee. I went to him and said, "O Uncle! Who shot you?" He pointed me out (his killer) saying, "That is my killer who shot me (with an arrow)." So I headed towards him and overtook him, and when he saw me, he fled, and I followed him and started saying to him, "Won't you be ashamed? Won't you stop?" So that person stopped, and we exchanged two hits with the swords and I killed him. Then I said to Abu 'Amir. "Allah has killed your killer." He said, "Take out this arrow" So I removed it, and water oozed out of the wound. He then said, "O son of my brother! Convey my compliments to the Prophet and request him to ask Allah's Forgiveness for me." Abu Amir made me his successor in commanding the people (i.e. troops). He survived for a short while and then died. (Later) I returned and entered upon the Prophet at his house, and found him lying in a bed made of stalks of date-palm leaves knitted with ropes, and on it there was bedding. The strings of the bed had their traces over his back and sides.Sahih al-Bukhari, 5:59:612

== See also ==
- Military career of Muhammad
- List of expeditions of Muhammad
