= Siege of Ta'if =

Part of Muhammad's campaigns in 630 CE

- Part of Muhammad's campaigns
Date	February 630 (8 AH)
Location	Ta'if, Arabia
Result	Inconclusive

Belligerents
First Islamic State	Hawazin; Thaqif

Commanders and leaders
Muhammad; Khalid ibn al-Walid; Ali ibn Abi Talib; Abu Sufyan; Tufayl ibn Amr	Malik ibn Awf; Abd-Ya-Layl ibn Amr

Strength
12,000	10,000

Casualties and losses
12 (Ibn Hisham)	Heavy

The Siege of Ta'if took place in 630 CE, shortly after the Muslim victory at the battles of Hunayn and Autas that followed the conquest of Mecca. Seeking to consolidate control over the Hijaz, Muhammad marched with his forces to the fortified city of Ta'if, stronghold of the Thaqif tribe and a long-standing commercial rival of Mecca. Many of the surviving Hawazin warriors and their families had taken refuge there after their defeat at Hunayn, making Ta'if the next target of the Muslim campaign. The city, however, was heavily fortified, surrounded by strong walls and well supplied with provisions, and thus presented a far more difficult challenge than the open-field encounters at Hunayn and Autas.

The Muslims laid siege to Taʿif using a variety of tactics, including attempts to cut orchards and vineyards, as well as deploying siege engines such as catapults and the manjaniq. Despite these efforts, the defenders repelled repeated assaults, and the city did not surrender. One of Ta'if's principal leaders, Urwah b. Masud, was absent in Yemen during the siege, leaving other chiefs in command of the defense. After several weeks of inconclusive fighting and with the approach of the pilgrimage season, Muhammad lifted the siege and returned to Mecca. Though unsuccessful militarily, the episode underscored the growing influence of the nascent Muslim state, and within a year Taʿif would accept Islam through negotiation and diplomacy rather than direct conquest.

== Background ==
After the conquest of Mecca in January 630 by the Muslims, Muhammads position in the Hejaz had strengthened significantly. Several tribal groups which had already had tensions with the Quraysh formed a coalition and aimed to check Muhammad's power. They met the Muslims at the valley of Hunayn where they had laid an ambush for them. However, the Muslims had recovered from this and routed the coalition, seizing large amounts of livestock, weapons and captives. Most of the survivors from these battles fled towards Ta'if with Muhammads army coming to the city just a few days later.

== Siege ==
A few unsuccessful attempts were made by Muhammad's forces to break through the gates of Ta'if. Later Muslim historians say Muhammad may have even used the Roman Testudo formation during this siege, but it was reported that the inhabitants of Ta'if were able to break this siege by dropping hot irons upon the Muslim armies from the city walls. Other methods were also attempted such as offering freedom to slaves who defected and cutting down vineyards. However, only ten people were able to avail themselves of this option and become followers of Muhammad.

At one point,, Sunni sources state the following regarding the siege of Ta'if:

Abu Sufyan ibn Harb lost his one eye in the siege of Ta'if. He told Muhammad of his loss for God to which Muhammad said “Which would you prefer: An eye in heaven or shall I pray to Allah that He brings it back?” To this Abu Sufyan said he would rather have his eye in heaven.

The siege went on for half a month with little change and soldiers became very impatient. Following consultation with advisors and a prophetic dream, Muhammad ended the siege and withdrew his forces.

== Motivations for ending the siege ==
After 15 days, the siege was lifted. This was primarily in due to Thaqifs fierce resistance and strong walls. If the siege had been allowed to go on, segments of his soldiers would've become restive and much of the prestige gained from Hunayn and its aftermath would have been lost. Another motivating factor was that any type of reconciliations with Thaqif after a long siege would have been harder.

== Aftermath ==
Although the siege was unsuccessful, Muhammad vowed to return to Ta'if after the lapse of the sacred months in which fighting was forbidden. During this period, the inhabitants of Ta'if, the Banu Thaqif, sent a delegation to Mecca. They demanded that Muhammad let them continue to worship their goddess Al-lāt for a period of three years, yet had conspired to have him assassinated. When this conspiracy was discovered, and their ambush failed, Muhammad refused the proposal and would only accept their surrender if they agreed to disarm. Eventually the Banu Thaqif consented to Muhammad's request, surrendering and allowing the Muslims into their city.

Muhammad sought to get the chief of the Banu Hawazan (called Malik) on his side, and promised the release of his family and the return of all his property if Malik embraced Islam. Malik accepted the offer and became a Muslim, aiding Muhammad in his blockade of Ta'if. Malik disrupted the ability of the citizens of Ta'if to graze their cattle outside of the city, further increasing the difficulty of life inside the walls.
