= Abd-Ya-Layl ibn Amr =

- عبد يا ليل بن عمرو
- Born: Taif, Saudi Arabia
- Occupation: Chieftain
- Tribe: Banu Thaqif

Abd-Ya-Layl ibn Amr (Arabic: عبد يا ليل بن عمرو), of the Banu Thaqif tribe was one of the chieftains of the city of Ta'if, a city hostile to Islam. However, in 631 or 632, he was included in a delegation that resulted in his tribe accepting Islam.

== See also ==
- Sahaba
