= Banu Thaqif =

Arab tribe of Ta'if, Saudi Arabia

Banu Thaqif بنو ثقيف
- Arabs
- Ethnicity: Arab
- Nisba: Thaqafi (الثقفي)
- Location: Ta'if, Saudi Arabia
- Descended from: Hawazin
- Language: Arabic
- Religion: Islam

Map of the Arabian Peninsula in 600 AD, showing the various Arab tribes and their areas of settlement. The Lakhmids (yellow) formed an ArSIISHarold Dixon during World War I, showing the presence of the Arab tribes in West Asia, 1914

The Banu Thaqif (Arabic: بنو ثقيف, romanized: Banū Thaqīf) is an Arab tribe from Hawazin which inhabited, and still inhabits, the city of Ta'if and its environs, in modern Saudi Arabia, and played a prominent role in early Islamic history.

During the pre-Islamic period, the Thaqif rivaled and cooperated with the Quraysh tribe of Mecca in trade and land ownership. The tribe initially opposed the Islamic prophet Muhammad, but following the Muslim siege of Ta'if in 630, they came to terms and embraced Islam. The Thaqif's inter-tribal networks and their relatively high education helped them quickly advance in the nascent Muslim state. They took on an especially important role in the conquest and administration of Iraq, providing the Rashidun and Umayyad caliphs capable and powerful governors for that province and the eastern Caliphate.

Among their notable governors in Iraq were al-Mughira ibn Shu'ba (638, 642–645), Ziyad ibn Abihi (665–673), and al-Hajjaj ibn Yusuf (694–714), while major Thaqafite commanders included Uthman ibn Abi al-As, who led the first Muslim naval expeditions in the 630s, Muhammad ibn al-Qasim, the conqueror of Sind in the 710s, and pro-Alid revolutionary Al-Mukhtar Ibn Abi Ubayd.

== Origins ==
The Thaqif is a branch of the Hawazin, a major tribal grouping of the Qays, but is often counted separately from the Hawazin in the traditional Arabic sources. According to Arab genealogical tradition, the progenitor of the Thaqif was Qasi ibn Munabbih ibn Bakr ibn Hawazin, whose epithet was 'Thaqif'. This genealogy made them 'nephews' of the Banu Sa'd and cousins of the Banu Nasr and Banu Amir.

Unlike its nomadic Hawazin counterparts, the Thaqif was a settled, or 'urban', tribe from the pre-Islamic period, living in the city of Ta'if, which they built a wall around. The tribe benefited from hosting the pilgrims visiting the idol of al-Lat housed in the city, as well as the pilgrims passing through on their way to the nearby sanctuary town of Mecca. The tribe prospered from cultivating Ta'if's orchards and agricultural lands, and from the caravan trade. The Thaqif cooperated and competed with the Quraysh of Mecca in both agriculture and trade, the two tribes often participating in joint caravans while also competing for ownership of Ta'if's agricultural estates. Before and after the advent of Islam in c. 630, the Thaqif and Quraysh, especially the latter's influential Umayyad house, forged considerable marital ties.

== Branches ==
The Thaqif was divided into two sections: the more prestigious Banu Malik or Banu Hutayt, which consisted of the Malik ibn Hutayt clan of the Jusham branch, and the Ahlaf ('Allies'), which consisted of the rest of the Jusham branch and all of the Awf branch. Though there were often clashes between the two sides, by the eve of the Muslim capture of Ta'if in 630 the two sides were on relatively equal footing in their control of Ta'if.

== Early Muslim period ==
=== Relations with Prophet Muhammad ===
The Thaqif contributed some men to the Quraysh against Muhammad during the Battle of Badr in 624. After Muhammad captured Mecca and gained the submission of the Quraysh, his emergent Muslim polity came under threat by the Thaqif in Ta'if and the tribe's nomadic Hawazin confederates. They viewed with alarm the greatly boosted position of Muhammad, now with their chief rival, the Quraysh, behind him. Muhammad moved to subdue the Thaqif and Hawazin in the ensuing Battle of Hunayn. The Thaqif–Hawazin coalition under Malik ibn Awf al-Nasri gained an early advantage but the tide turned and the Muslims routed the coalition, taking thousands of Hawazin women and children captive and considerable booty. The Muslims proceeded to besiege Ta'if, where many of the Bedouin warriors of the Hawazin took refuge. Many of the Qurayshites in the Muslim army were motivated to prevent the Thaqafites from capturing their estates near Ta'if. When the siege faltered, Muhammad succeeded in turning Malik ibn Awf and his Bedouin warriors against the Thaqif and they blockaded the roads leading into Ta'if.

The siege compelled the Thaqif to send a delegation led by one of their chiefs, Abd Yalil, to Muhammad to negotiate their conversion to Islam. After the submission of the Thaqif, its idols in Ta'if were destroyed and the tribe lost the religious prestige it previously held as the idols' guardians. Despite their defeat, the Thaqif became firmly incorporated into the Muslim community and, in the words of the historian Hugh N. Kennedy, Muhammad had "secured the allegiance and services" of another "able and experienced group" as he had done with the Quraysh. As with the latter, the Thaqafites marshaled their political know-how and tribal contacts in service of the Muslim state as its formed and expanded its territory.

=== Role in the conquest of Iraq ===
Among the Thaqafite delegates to Muhammad was Uthman ibn Abi al-As of the Banu Malik, who Muhammad appointed as his amil (agent, governor, or tax collector) over the Thaqif. When most of the Arab tribes discarded the authority of the Muslim state following Muhammad's death in 632, in what became known as the Ridda wars, Uthman played an important role in preventing the Thaqif from similarly defecting. With the Ridda wars' conclusion in 633, Uthman and several Thaqafis played command roles in the early Muslim conquests and occupied prominent roles in the emergent Caliphate, especially in the wealthy region of Iraq. The Quraysh paid less attention to Sasanian Iraq than to Byzantine Syria in the leadup to the conquests of those two regions in the mid-to-late 630s. As the Muslim war efforts in Iraq began to intensify, the Thaqafites, as well as the Ansar natives of Medina, played the leadership roles and contributed significant numbers of men there, along with the nomadic tribes who lived near the region, such as the Banu Tamim and the Banu Bakr. Caliph Umar appointed the Thaqafite Abu Ubayd ibn Mas'ud as the conquest's overall commander in 634, but he was slain during the Battle of the Bridge, where the Sasanians defeated the Muslims.

While the overall command in Iraq eventually passed to the Qurayshite companion of Muhammad, Sa'd ibn Abi Waqqas, the Thaqafites played the central role in the front that was opened in southern Iraq, around the port of al-Ubulla, and neighboring Khuzistan. The commander there, Utba ibn Ghazwan al-Mazini, was married into the Thaqif, and his successor was the Thaqafite companion of Muhammad, al-Mughira ibn Shu'ba. These Thaqafites founded Basra, the chief garrison city of the Muslim Arabs in southern Iraq, in c. 638 and continued to be prominent in the city through later decades.

=== Administration of Iraq and the east ===
The literacy of the Thaqif in the pre-Islamic and early Islamic periods was on par with the Quraysh, and was a key factor in the Muslim state's recruitment of Thaqafite tribesmen to important administrative positions. Al-Mughira founded the tax administration in Basra, and was later appointed governor of Kufa in 642, remaining in the post until he was dismissed in 645. Knowledgeable in Persian, the language of the bureaucracy in Iraq, and having gained considerable experience among the Arab tribal soldiery who settled in Iraq, he was reappointed by Caliph Mu'awiya I (r. 661–680) as governor of Kufa in 661 and held office until his death in 671.

Through al-Mughira's good offices with the caliph, he secured the pardon of his protege, the adoptive Thaqafite Ziyad ibn Abihi, in 664. Ziyad had been educated by al-Mughira's cousin, Jubayr ibn Hayya ibn Mas'ud ibn Mu'attib, who served a secretarial position in the Iraqi administration. Ziyad became the powerful governor of Basra in 665, and after al-Mughira's death, was assigned the governorship of Kufa as well, making him the viceroy of Iraq and the eastern Caliphate. He enacted major reforms to Iraq's military organization and restarted the Muslim conquests into Central Asia. After his death in 673, he was succeeded by his son Ubayd Allah ibn Ziyad, while several more of his sons gained deputy governorships and important commands. Their education, experience with Iraqi affairs, and close ties with the Quraysh, particularly its Umayyad house, well-positioned the Thaqafites to administer Iraq and its eastern dependencies under the Umayyad caliphs. According to Kennedy, Mu'awiya contracted the governance of Iraq and the east "to what must have been seen as a Thaqafi mafia".

The Umayyad caliph Abd al-Malik (r. 685–705) appointed the Thaqafite al-Hajjaj ibn Yusuf over Iraq and the east in 694. Although coming from Ta'if, al-Hajjaj benefited from his tribal ties with the Thaqif of Iraq. Like the other Thaqafites who administered Iraq, al-Hajjaj had been a man of letters, in his case, working as a teacher before taking up a military career. He married several Qurayshite women, including an Umayyad, while his niece, the daughter of Muhammad ibn Yusuf al-Thaqafi, married the Umayyad caliph Yazid II (r. 720–724) and was the mother of his son, Caliph al-Walid II (r. 743–744). Al-Hajjaj was not tribally partisan in his administrative and military appointments (see Qays-Yaman rivalry), but nevertheless paid special favor to his Thaqafite kinsmen. He appointed three of al-Mughira's sons, his brother Muhammad, and several other family members as district governors, while commissioning his capable nephew, Muhammad ibn al-Qasim, as the conqueror and governor of Sind.

== Modern ==
During his travels to Arabia, including Ta'if, Johann Ludwig Burckhardt noted that the Thaqif remained "a very powerful tribe" which controlled most of Ta'if's gardens and agricultural lands, as well as elsewhere along the eastern ridges of the Hejaz mountains. They constituted half of Ta'if's inhabitants at that time, while part of the tribe lived as Bedouins outside of the city where they possessed large herds of goats and sheep. Militarily, they lacked horses and camels, but could mobilize some two thousand riflemen equipped with matchlocks. Members of the Thaqif, both settled and nomadic, continue to reside in Ta'if.

== Bibliography ==
- Burckhardt, Johann Ludwig (2010) [1830]. Notes on the Bedouins and Wahabys: Collected During His Travels in the East. New York: Cambridge University Press. ISBN 978-1-108-02290-3.
- Crone, Patricia (1980). Slaves on Horses: The Evolution of the Islamic Polity (1980 ed.). Cambridge: Cambridge University Press. ISBN 978-0521229616.
- Crone, Patricia (1994). "Were the Qays and Yemen of the Umayyad Period Political Parties?". Der Islam. 71 (1). Walter de Gruyter and Co.: 1–57. doi:10.1515/islm.1994.71.1.1. ISSN 0021-1818. S2CID 154370527.
- Ishaq, Mohammad (1945). "A Peep Into the First Arab Expeditions to India under the Companions of the Prophet". Islamic Culture. 19 (2): 109–114.
- Kennedy, Hugh (2004) [1986]. The Prophet and the Age of the Caliphates: The Islamic Near East from the 6th to the 11th Century (Second ed.). Harlow: Longman. ISBN 978-0-582-40525-7.
- Kister, M. J. "Some Reports Concerning Ta'if". Jerusalem Studies in Arabic and Islam.
- Lammens, H. & Kamal, Abd al-Hafez (1971). "Ḥunayn". In Lewis, B.; Ménage, V. L.; Pellat, Ch. & Schacht, J. (eds.). The Encyclopaedia of Islam, Second Edition. Volume III: H–Iram. Leiden: E. J. Brill. p. 578. OCLC 495469525.
- Lecker, M. (2000). "Thakīf". In Bearman, P. J.; Bianquis, Th.; Bosworth, C. E.; van Donzel, E. & Heinrichs, W. P. (eds.). The Encyclopaedia of Islam, Second Edition. Volume X: T–U. Leiden: E. J. Brill. p. 432. ISBN 978-90-04-11211-7.
- Lecker, Michael (2016) [2005]. People, Tribes and Society in Arabia Around the Time of Muhammad. Abingdon: Routledge. ISBN 978-0-86078-963-5.
- Watt, W. Montgomery (1971). "Hawāzin". In Lewis, B.; Ménage, V. L.; Pellat, Ch. & Schacht, J. (eds.). The Encyclopaedia of Islam, Second Edition. Volume III: H–Iram. Leiden: E. J. Brill. pp. 285–286. OCLC 495469525.
