= Awtas =

Awṭās Arabic: أَوْطَاس
- Locality
- Flag Coat of arms

- Location in Saudi Arabia Awṭās (Middle East) Awṭās (West and Central Asia)
- Coordinates: 21°26′N 40°21′E
- Country: Saudi Arabia
- Province: Makkah
- Established: The 6th century

Government
  - Provincial Governor: Meshal bin Abdullah Al Saud
- Elevation: 1,879 m (6,165 ft)
- Time zone: UTC+3 (Arabian Standard Time)

Autas or Awtas (Arabic: أَوْطَاس, romanized: Awṭās) is a location in western Saudi Arabia where the battles of Hunan and Autas took place.

== Description ==
Awtas is located between Mecca and Taif at a distance of 14–15 miles (23–24 kilometres) from Mecca. It is located in the Hunain Valley of the Sarawat Mountains.

== See also ==
- Middle East
  - Arabian Peninsula
    - Al-Ji'ranah
    - Badr, Saudi Arabia
