= Malik ibn Awf =

Companion of Muhammad

- Born: c. 6th century Ta'if, Hejaz, Saudi Arabia
- Died: 640 (39-40 years old); Damascus
- Other name: Abu Ali
- Occupation: Poet
- Known for: Fighting against the Muslims in the Battle of Hunayn
- Children: Ali
- Relatives: Aunt Umm Abdullah bint Abi Umayyah
- Family: Bani Nasr bin Saad
- Military career
- Conflicts: Against Muslims; Battle of Hunayn (630); For Muslims; Siege of Damascus (634); Battle of al-Qadisiyya (636)

Mālik ibn ʿAwf (Arabic: مالك بن عوف) was a companion of Muhammad and a leader of the Hawazin tribe of Ta'if. Before he converted to Islam, he was one of the commanders in the Battle of Hunayn against the Muslims. His tribe, Hawazin, fought in the battle along with the Thaqif tribe. He was a prominent knight who commanded armies and held a high rank among his people. He converted to Islam before Muhammad's death.

== Muhammad's visit to Ta'if ==
In the year 619, Prophet Muhammad's uncle Abu Talib died and a few weeks later his wife Khadija also died. As a result, the Prophet was deprived of the care and support he received from his uncle in his public life and from his wife at home. The position in Makkah was becoming more and more difficult for him.

So he travelled to Tai'f, a town in the mountains about forty-five miles away from Mecca, where the tribe of Thaqif lived, to seek their support to defend himself against his tribe. At the same time, he wished that they would accept the message with which Allah had sent him.

Malik ibn Awf criticized Muhammad when he came to Ta'if to spread Islam. When Muhammad went to the Thaqif leaders to proselytize, Awf and the leaders condemned his teachings. The Thaqif leaders sent their slaves to chase him out of the town, throwing stones and other things at him, until his feet bled.

== Battle of Hunayn ==
Awf participated in the Battle of Hunayn after the Conquest of Mecca. Before the battle began, Awf ordered his fighters to shoot arrows at the Muslims. The Muslim fighters began to flee. Muhammad ordered Abbas ibn Abdul-Muttalib to call the Muslim army back to fight. Abbas did so, and approx 100 Muslims came back to the battle. After seeing those soldiers fight, the rest of the Muslim army returned. The Muslims won; Awf and his army fled to Ta'if. A verse of the Qur'an was revealed on this incident. Muhammad and his army laid siege to Ta'if, but they failed to take the city.

== Full name ==
Malik ibn Awf's full name was Malik bin Awf bin Saad bin Rabia bin Waelah bin Dahman bin Nasr bin Muawiya bin Bakr bin Hawazen bin Mansour bin Ikrimah bin Khasfah bin Qais Aylan bin Mudar bin Nizar bin Maad bin Adnan bin Adad.

== Conversion to Islam ==
Malik bin Auf al-Nasri al-Saad had led the Hawazin and Thaqif tribes to the Muslim war in Hunayn, so they were defeated and their money, family and offspring fell into the hands of the Muslims.

Ibn Ishaq said: "The Messenger of God, peace and blessings be upon him, said to the delegation of Hawazin on the authority of Malik bin Auf al-Nasri, What did he do? They said: He is in Taif with Thaqif. The Messenger of God, peace and blessings be upon him, said: (Tell Malik that if a Muslim comes to me, I will return his family and money to him, and give him a hundred camels). Malik came with that, so he went out to the Messenger of God, peace be upon him, from Taif, and he was Malik. So he ran until he came to his camel, where he ordered it to be imprisoned, so he rode it. So he followed the Messenger of God, may God bless him and grant him peace, and caught him in Al-Jaranah or in Mecca, and the Messenger of God, peace be upon him, returned his family and money to him, and gave him a hundred camels."

After Malik's conversion, Muhammad used him over his people and those with him and remained with them until the war of conquests took place, where he participated with his tribe in the Battle of al-Qadisiyya, and they had an interest in it, as he witnessed the conquest of the city of Damascus and resided there, and it became for him a house known as the House of Bani Nasr, which Malik first lodged Damascus opened.
