= Muslim conquest of Tokharistan =

The Muslim conquest of Tokharistan, roughly ancient Bactria, an area today divided between Afghanistan, Tajikistan and Uzbekistan, was initiated during the Rashidun period during the reign of caliph Umar, but did not complete until the late Umayyad rule, in c. 740.

== Background ==
According to the most general usage of the name, Tokharistan is the wide valley around the upper Oxus river surrounded by mountains on three sides before the river moves into open plains. The major city was Balkh, one of the greatest urban centers of northeastern Iran. It was located upon crossroads and conduits of trade in many directions, enabling control of these routes if it was conquered. Sanskrit, Greek, Latin and Chinese sources from the 2nd century BC to the 7th century AD, identify a people called "Tukharas", in the country later called Tukharistan. During the governorship of Abu 'l Abbas 'Abdallah b. Tahir (r. 828–845), a list of districts (kuwar) of the region exists, including as far as Saghaniyan in the north and Kabul in the south. Other places listed are Tirmidh, Juzjan, Bamiyan, Rūb and Samanjan. Some Arab geographers used the name only for the southern part of Oxus valley. Balkh was also a part of Khorasan along with other areas through varying extensions of time.

== Conquest ==
Per al-Tabari, Yazdegerd fled from Marw-al Rudh to Balkh during al-Ahnaf 's conquest of Khorasan in 643. He fortified himself but was defeated by the Arabs and fled across the Oxus River. Yazdegerd proceeded to Soghd, whose ruler supplied him a large army. The Khaqan of Turks after assembling the troops from Ferghana, crossed the Oxus along with Yazdegerd and marched to Balkh.

In 652, Ibn Amir sent al-Ahnaf to invade Tokharistan with 4,000 Arabs and 1,000 Iranian Muslims (evidently the Tamimis and asawira), probably because of assistance of its ruler to Yazdegerd's son Peroz. He approached Balkh after conquering Marw al-Rudh and fighting an inconclusive battle with a 30,000-strong force from Guzgan, Faryab and Talqan. After arriving at Balkh, he besieged the city, with its inhabitants offering a tribute of 400,000 or 700,000 dirhams. He deputed his cousin to collect the tribute and advanced to Khwarezm but returned to Balkh as winter approached. It was in Balkh in fall of 652 when the local people introduced his cousin Asid to gifting gold and silver to their governor during Mihrijan.

Ziyad b. Abi Sufyan reorganised Basra and Kufa, excluding many from the diwan and inspiring him to settle 50,000 families in Khorasan. Both Baladhuri and Mad'aini agree upon the number, though the latter states each half were from Basra and Kufa. Al-'Ali disagrees, stating the Kufans were 10,000. Ghalib had been unsuccessful in his expedition, and Rabi b. Ziyad al-Harithi, who was appointed governor of Khorasan in 671, led the settlement expedition. He advanced to Balkh and made a peace treaty with the locals who had revolted after al-Ahnaf's earlier treaty.

Qutayba ibn Muslim led the final conquest of Balkh. He was tasked with subduing the revolt in Lower Tokharistan. His army was assembled in the spring of 705 and marched through Marw al-Rudh and Talqan to Balkh. Per one version in Tarikh al-Tabari, the city was surrendered peacefully. Another version, probably to promote a Bahilite claim on the Barmakids, speaks of a revolt among the residents. The latter may be the correct version as Tabari describes the city as ruined four years later. The wife of Barmak, a physician of Balkh, was taken captive during the war and given to 'Abdullah, Qutayba's brother. She was later restored to her lawful husband after spending a period in 'Abdullah's harem. Khalid was thus born in 706 and Abdallah accepted the implications of paternity without disturbing Barmak's conventional responsibilities or affecting Khalid's upbringing.

In 708–709, the Ispahbadh, who was a local ruler, received a letter from the Hephthalite rebel Nezak Tarkhan, who was trying to unite the aristocracy of Tokharistan against Qutayba. The Arabs built a new military encampment called Baruqan two farsangs away from the city. In 725, the governor Asad ibn Abdallah al-Qasri had the city restored after a feud among Arab troops, with Barmak being employed as his agent for the task.

Badakhshan was earlier the seat of the Tukharas. There is no precise date for the Arab conquest of Badakhshan nor any record of how Islam was introduced there. Al-Tabari too mentions this region only once. In 736, Asad ibn Abdallah al-Qasri sent an expedition into Upper Tokharistan and Badakhshan against the rebel Al-Harith ibn Surayj who had occupied the fortress of Tabushkhan. Juday' b. 'Ali al-Kirmani, who was sent on the expedition against al-Harith, captured Tabushkhan. Juday also had its captive defenders killed while its women and children were enslaved and sold in Balkh despite being of Arab origin. al-Harith later allied with the Turgesh and continued his rebellion until being pardoned by Caliph Yazid b. Walid in 744.

Taking advantage of the factional fighting among the Arabs, Transoxiana started rebelling and Asad b. 'Abdallah in response attacked Khuttal in 737. Armed forces of Soghd, Chach and many Turks, led by the Turkish Khagan Sulu, arrived to assist them. Asad fled leaving behind the baggage of plunder from Khuttal. When he returned with the main body of his troops, the Turks retired to Tokharistan and he returned to Balkh. In December 737, the Turgesh attacked Khulm but were repelled by the Arabs. Bypassing Balkh, they captured Guzgan's capital and sent out raiding parties. Asad mounted a surprise attack on the Turks at Kharistan, who only had 4,000 troops. The Turgesh suffered a devastating defeat and lost almost whole of their army. Sulu and al-Harith fled to the territory of Tokharistan's Yabghu, with Sulu returning to his territory in winter of 737–738.

== Aftermath ==
Early Arabs tended to treat Iran as a single cultural unit, however it was a land of many countries with distinct populations and cultures. From historical evidence, it appears that Tokharistan was the only area heavily colonized by Arabs where Buddhism flourished, and the only area incorporated into the Arab empire where Sanskrit studies were pursued up to the conquest. The grandson of Barmak was the vizier of the Arab empire and took personal interest in Sanskrit works and Indian religions. The eighth-century Korean traveller Hui'Chao records Hinayanists in Balkh under Arab rule. He visited the area around 726, mentioning that the true king of Balkh was still alive and in exile. He also describes all the inhabitants of the regions as Buddhists under Arab rule. Other sources indicate however that the Bactrians practiced many different religions.

Among Balkh's Buddhist monasteries, the largest was Nava Vihara, later Persianized to Naw Bahara after the Islamic conquest of Balkh. It is not known how long it continued to serve as a place of worship after the conquest. Accounts of early Arabs offer contradictory narratives. Per al-Baladhuri, its stupa-vihara complex was destroyed under Mu'awiya in 650s. Tabari while reporting about the expedition in 650s, does not mention any tension around the temple, stating that Balkh was conquered by Rabi peacefully. He also states that Nizak went to pray at the site during his revolt against Qutayba in 709, implying it may not have been destroyed. Also, the tenth-century geographical treatise Hudud al-'Alam describes remaining royal buildings and Naw Bahara's decorations including painted image and wonderful works, probably secco or fresco murals and carvings on the temple's walls that survived into the author's time.
