= Battle of the Baggage =

737 Umayyad defeat in Transoxiana

- Part of the Muslim conquest of Transoxiana
- Map of Khurasan and Transoxiana in the 8th century
Date	30 September 737
Location	Upper course of the Oxus river (modern northern Afghanistan)
Result	Türgesh victory

Belligerents
Umayyad Caliphate al-Saghaniyan	Türgesh Khaganate; Principality of Khuttal and other Transoxianian allies

Commanders and leaders
Asad ibn Abdallah al-Qasri; Ibrahim ibn Asim al-'Uqayli	Suluk

Strength
Unknown	50,000

The Battle of the Baggage (Arabic: ﻳﻮﻡ ﺍلاﺛﻘﺎﻝ, romanized: Yawm al-athqāl), was fought between the forces of the Umayyad Caliphate and the Turkic Türgesh tribes on 30 September 737. The Umayyads under the governor of Khurasan, Asad ibn Abdallah al-Qasri, had invaded the Principality of Khuttal in Transoxiana, and the local ruler called upon the Türgesh for aid. The Umayyad army retreated in haste before the Türgesh arrived, managing to cross the Oxus River just in time, while their rearguard engaged the pursuing Türgesh. The Türgesh crossed immediately after, and attacked the exposed Muslim baggage train, which had been sent ahead, and captured it. The main Umayyad army came to the rescue of the baggage train's escort, which suffered heavy casualties. The failure of the Umayyad campaign meant the complete collapse of the Arab control in the Upper Oxus valley, and opened Khurasan itself to the Türgesh.

== Background ==
The region of Transoxiana had been conquered by the Arab Muslims under Qutayba ibn Muslim in 705–715, following the Muslim conquest of Persia and of Khurasan in the mid-7th century. The loyalty of Transoxiana's native Iranian and Turkic populations to the Umayyad Caliphate remained questionable, however, and in 719 the various Transoxianian princes sent a petition to the Chinese court and their Türgesh vassals for military aid against the Caliphate's governors. In response, from 720 on the Türgesh launched a series of attacks against the Muslims in Transoxiana, coupled with uprisings among the native Sogdians. The Umayyad governors initially managed to suppress the unrest, but control over the Ferghana Valley was lost and in 724 the Arabs suffered a major disaster (the "Day of Thirst") while trying to recapture it. Half-hearted efforts by the Umayyad government to placate the local population and win their support were soon reversed, and heavy-handed Arab actions further alienated the local elites. Consequently, in 728 a large-scale Transoxianan uprising broke out with Türgesh aid, which led to the Caliphate losing most of Transoxiana except for the region around Samarkand.

The Muslims suffered another major defeat in the Battle of the Defile in 731, in which they lost some 20,000–30,000 men, crippling the native Khurasani Arab army and necessitating the transfer of new troops from Iraq. In the years after the Defile, Samarkand too was lost and the Sogdians under Ghurak regained their independence, while Muslim military activity north of the Oxus River was severely curtailed: what little campaigning is mentioned in the contemporary sources before 735 concerns operations to maintain the allegiance of the principalities of Tokharistan in the upper Oxus valley. In addition, the Umayyad authorities were preoccupied by the rebellion of al-Harith ibn Surayj, which broke out in early 734, spread quickly, and gathered the support of a large portion of the indigenous Iranian population. At one point, the rebel army even threatened the provincial capital, Marw. The arrival of the experienced Asad ibn Abdallah al-Qasri, who had already served as governor of Khurasan in 725–727, and who brought with him twenty thousand veteran and loyal Syrian troops, managed to reverse the tide and suppress Harith's revolt, although the rebel leader himself managed to escape to Badakhshan. During the year 736, Asad devoted himself to administrative matters in his province, the most important of which was the rebuilding of Balkh, to which he transferred his seat. In the meantime, Asad sent Juday al-Kirmani against the remnants of Harith's followers, whom Junayd succeeded in evicting from their strongholds in Upper Tokharistan and Badakhshan.

== Battle ==
In 737, Asad launched a campaign into the Principality of Khuttal, whose rulers had supported the Türgesh and Harith's rebellion. Asad was initially successful, but the Khuttalan regent, Ibn al-Sa'iji, called upon the Türgesh for aid. While the Muslim army was scattered pillaging, the Türgesh khagan Suluk brought his army, allegedly 50,000 strong, from his capital Tokmok into Khuttal within 17 days. Ibn al-Sa'iji, who tried to play both sides off against each other, informed Asad of the Türgesh expedition only shortly before its arrival. Asad had time enough to send ahead his heavy baggage train, laden with the plunder and captives from Khuttal, back south under the command of Ibrahim ibn Asim al-Uqayli, accompanied by the contingent from the allied principality of al-Saghaniyan. Asad with the main Muslim army remained behind, but at the arrival of the Türgesh host, Asad's troops broke into a headlong flight for the Oxus, which they managed to reach just ahead of the Türgesh. The crossing of the river was a confused affair, as Asad ordered each of his soldiers to carry across one of the sheep the army had brought with it as provisions. In the end, the sheep had to be abandoned as the pursuing Türgesh attacked the Arab rearguard, composed of the Azdi and Tamimi tribal contingents, on the north bank. As the rear guard was thrown back, Asad's army hurried to cross the river in panic.

Once south of the river, Asad, believing himself to be safe from pursuit, ordered his men to set up camp and sent orders to Ibrahim to halt the baggage train and likewise set up camp. The Türgesh khagan, after consulting the local rulers, followed the advice of the ruler of al-Ishtikhan and led his army to cross the river en masse. Faced with a full-scale charge of the Türgesh and their allies' cavalry, the Arabs withdrew to their camp. The Türgesh attacked the camp but were turned back after a fight in which, according to al-Tabari, the Arabs' servants put on pack-saddle cloths as armour and used the tent-poles to strike at the riders' faces. During the night the Türgesh departed, and rode south to overtake the Arab baggage train. Ibrahim ibn Asim had dug a trench around his encampment and his troops managed to beat off the first attacks by the khagan’s Sogdian allies. Then the khagan, after climbing a hill and scouting out the dispositions of the baggage escort, dispatched a portion of his men to attack the camp from behind, focusing on the allied Iranian troops from Saghaniyan, while the rest of the army attacked the Muslims from the front. The Türgesh attack almost annihilated the defenders: the greater part of the troops of Saghaniyan, along with their king, the Saghan Khudah, fell, and the Türgesh seized most of the baggage train. Only the timely arrival of Asad with the main Arab army saved the remnant of the baggage train escort from destruction. According to the account of al-Tabari, the Türgesh launched another unsuccessful attack on Asad's camp the following day, 1 October 737, and then departed.

== Aftermath ==
While the Arab army returned to its base at Balkh, the Türgesh wintered in Tokharistan, where they were joined by Harith. The campaign had been a disaster for Asad and his now mainly Syrian army; Muslim control north of the Oxus had collapsed entirely, and while the Arab governor had been able to escape complete destruction, he had suffered considerable casualties. The losses suffered by the Syrians under Asad's command in the 737 campaign in Khuttal were of particularly grave importance in the long term, as the Syrian army was the main pillar of the Umayyad regime. Its numerical decline in Khurasan meant that the Khurasan-born Arabs could no longer be completely controlled by force; this opened the way for the appointment of a native Khurasani Arab governor, Nasr ibn Sayyar, to succeed Asad, and, eventually, for the outbreak of the Abbasid Revolution that toppled the Umayyad regime.

As the Arabs customarily did not campaign during winter, Asad demobilized his men. On Harith's urging, on the other hand, the Türgesh khagan decided to launch a winter attack south of the Oxus, hoping to raise the local population in revolt against the Arabs. In this he was joined not only by Harith and his followers, but by the great majority of the native princes of Sogdiana and Tokharistan. Asad quickly mobilized his forces and managed to catch the khagan himself with a small part of his army and defeat them at Kharistan. Although both the khagan and Harith escaped capture, the Battle of Kharistan struck a blow to the khagan’s prestige, and Suluk's murder by his rivals a short while afterwards saved the Muslims from worse.

Under Asad's successor, Nasr ibn Sayyar, the Muslim armies recovered most of Transoxiana, and with the Battle of Talas in 751 and the turmoil of the An Shi Rebellion, which terminated Chinese influence in Central Asia, Muslim dominance in the region was secured.

== Sources ==
- Blankinship, Khalid Yahya, ed. (1989). The History of al-Ṭabarī, Volume XXV: The End of Expansion: The Caliphate of Hishām, A.D. 724–738/A.H. 105–120. SUNY Series in Near Eastern Studies. Albany, New York: State University of New York Press. ISBN 978-0-88706-569-9.
- Blankinship, Khalid Yahya (1994). The End of the Jihâd State: The Reign of Hishām ibn ʻAbd al-Malik and the Collapse of the Umayyads. Albany, New York: State University of New York Press. ISBN 978-0-7914-1827-7.
- Gibb, H. A. R. (1923). The Arab Conquests in Central Asia. London: The Royal Asiatic Society.
- Kennedy, Hugh (2001). The Armies of the Caliphs: Military and Society in the Early Islamic State. London and New York: Routledge. ISBN 0-415-25093-5.
