= Battle of Kharistan =

Battle fought in 737 between Caliphate and Türgesh tribal confederation

- Part of the Muslim conquest of Transoxiana
- Map of Khurasan and Transoxiana in the 8th century
Date	December 737
Location	Kharistan (near Maymanah, modern northern Afghanistan) 35°56′N 64°45′E
Result	Umayyad victory: End of Türgesh offensive in Khorasan and Transoxania

Belligerents
Umayyad Caliphate; Principality of Juzjan	Türgesh Khaganate; Sogdian princes of Transoxiana

Commanders and leaders
Asad ibn Abdallah al-Qasri	Suluk al-Harith ibn Surayj

Strength
c. 7,000 men	c. 4,000 men
- Location within Afghanistan

The Battle of Kharistan was fought between the forces of the Umayyad Caliphate and the Turkic Türgesh in December 737 near the town of Kharistan in Juzjan, eastern Khurasan (modern northern Afghanistan). The Umayyads, under the governor of Khurasan, Asad ibn Abdallah al-Qasri, managed to surprise and defeat the Türgesh khagan, Suluk, and his ally, the Arab renegade al-Harith ibn Surayj.

The Arab armies of the Umayyad Caliphate had conquered most of Transoxiana in the early years of the 8th century, as part of the Muslim conquests. From c. 720, Umayyad rule was increasingly challenged by attacks from the Turkic Türgesh nomads from the north, and revolts of the native princes of Transoxiana. After a major defeat in the Battle of the Defile in 731, the Umayyads lost control over most of Transoxiana, while in 734–736 al-Harith ibn Surayj led a major rebellion against the caliphate's governors in Khurasan itself. The appointment of the veteran Asad ibn Abdallah al-Qasri brought about the defeat of Ibn Surayj, but in 737 Asad's attempt to restore Umayyad control over Khuttal ended in a debacle when the Türgesh attacked his army. Although Asad managed to save most of his force, he suffered heavy losses, and lost most of his army's baggage train and its escort in the Battle of the Baggage on 30 September. Asad withdrew to Balkh, leaving the field to the Türgesh.

While the Arab army demobilized and returned to their homes for winter, the Türgesh ruler Suluk, now advised by Ibn Surayj, launched an invasion of Lower Tokharistan. This left Asad with far fewer men to confront the Türgesh invasion, but when the Türgesh ruler dispersed his army to raid and gather forage, Asad seized the opportunity to confront him. With 7,000 men he surprised Suluk, who had only about 4,000 troops with him, and defeated him near Kharistan. The Türgesh ruler and Ibn Surayj managed to flee, but his camp fell into Arab hands, and most of the roaming bands of the Türgesh army were destroyed. This unexpected victory shored up the threatened Umayyad position in Khurasan, while diminishing the prestige of Suluk, who fell victim to inter-Türgesh rivalries in early 738. Asad's successor Nasr ibn Sayyar was able to use the collapse of Türgesh power, and by c. 743 had restored the Arab position in Transoxiana almost to what it had been before the Türgesh intervention.

== Background ==
The region of Transoxiana (Arabic: Ma wara' al-nahr) had been conquered by the Muslim Arabs of the Umayyad Caliphate under Qutayba ibn Muslim in 705–715, following the Muslim conquest of Persia and of Khurasan in the mid-7th century. The loyalty of Transoxiana's native Iranian and Turkic populations to the Umayyads remained questionable, however, and in 719 the various Transoxianian princes sent a petition to the Chinese court and their Türgesh vassals for military aid against the caliphate's governors. In response, from c. 720 the Türgesh launched a series of attacks against the Umayyads in Transoxiana, coupled with uprisings among the native Sogdians. The Umayyad governors initially managed to suppress the unrest, but control over the Ferghana Valley was lost and in 724 the Arabs suffered a major disaster (the "Day of Thirst") while trying to recapture it. The Umayyad government made some half-hearted attempts to placate the local population and win the support of local elites, but in 728 a large-scale uprising broke out. With Türgesh aid, the Umayyad garrisons were evicted, and the caliphate lost most of Transoxiana except for the region around Samarkand.

The Umayyads suffered another major defeat in the Battle of the Defile in 731, after which Samarkand too was lost. The Sogdians under Ghurak regained their independence, while Muslim military activity north of the Oxus River was severely curtailed, with the Umayyads focusing their efforts at keeping control of the principalities of Tokharistan in the upper Oxus valley. In addition, the Umayyad authorities were preoccupied by the rebellion of al-Harith ibn Surayj in Khurasan itself. The revolt broke out in early 734, spread quickly across the province and gathered the support of a large portion of the indigenous Iranian population. At one point, the rebel army even threatened the provincial capital, Marw. The arrival of the experienced Asad ibn Abdallah al-Qasri, who had served as governor of Khurasan in 724–727 and now brought with him 20,000 veteran and loyal Syrian troops, managed to reverse the tide and suppress Ibn Surayj's revolt, although the rebel leader himself managed to escape.

In 737, Asad launched a campaign into the principality of Khuttal, whose rulers had supported the Türgesh and Ibn Surayj's rebellion. Asad was initially successful, but the Khuttalans called on the Türgesh for aid. The Türgesh khagan Suluk led some 50,000 of his men south in response. Asad received very little notice of this, and at the approach of the Türgesh the Umayyad army panicked and fled headlong to the Oxus. Amidst much confusion, and with the Türgesh on their heels, the Umayyad troops managed to cross the river. They were followed, however, by the Türgesh, who attacked the Umayyads in their camp. On the next day, 30 September, the Türgesh found and captured the Umayyad baggage train and annihilated the Umayyads' allied contingent from al-Saghaniyan, which Asad had sent off ahead, in the so-called "Battle of the Baggage".

== Battle ==
The campaign had been a disaster for Asad and his now mainly Syrian army; Umayyad control north of the Oxus had collapsed entirely, and while the governor had been able to escape complete destruction, he had suffered considerable casualties. Asad led his troops back to Balkh, but the Türgesh remained in Tokharistan, where they were joined by Ibn Surayj. As the Arabs customarily did not campaign during winter, Asad demobilized his men. On Ibn Surayj's urging, on the other hand, the Türgesh khagan decided to launch a winter attack into Lower Tokharistan, hoping to raise the local population in revolt against the Umayyads. In this he was joined not only by Ibn Surayj and his followers, but by most of the native princes of Sogdiana and Tokharistan.

Asad was apprised of this on the evening of 7 December, when messages arrived at Balkh that the Türgesh and their allies, some 30,000 strong, were at the nearby fortress of Jazzah. (Note: The exact location of Jazza is unknown. It appears only in al-Tabari's report on the events of 737, where it is described as a fortress belonging to Juzjan, apparently on the eastern edge of that principality, close to Balkh. Nicholas Sims-Williams suggests it might be identifiable with the village of Darra Gaz, mentioned in the mountains south of Balkh in the 14th–19th centuries.) Asad ordered signal fires to be lit and mobilized his Syrian troops, although he had to pay each man twenty dirhams to persuade them to fight. Asad initially refused to call upon the help of the local Khurasani Arabs, indicating the level of mistrust existing by now between the latter and the representatives of the Umayyad regime; in the end, however, he relented, and gathered a force of 7,000 men. In the meantime, Suluk attacked Khulm, but after being repelled marched on to Peroz Nakhsher/Peroz Bakhshin. (Note: Exact spelling uncertain, and otherwise unidentified.) Bypassing Balkh, the Türgesh seized the capital of Juzjan, (Note: The unnamed "capital of Juzjan" is variously given by medieval Muslim authors as Anbar (mod. Sar-i-Pul), al-Yahudiyyah (mod. Maymanah), Shibarghan, or the city of Kundaram (mod. Gurziwan).) and then dispersed and sent out mounted raiding parties in all directions, with some reaching as far as Marw al-Rudh, some 350 kilometres (220 miles) south and east of Balkh. This was possibly done in search of forage, since such a large army could not otherwise be sustained during the winter. Against the expectations of Ibn Surayj, however, the ruler of Juzjan elected to side with Asad, who, informed of these events by the governor of Khulm, set out to engage the Türgesh.

The account in al-Tabari of the ensuing battle is confused and, according to the Orientalist H. A. R. Gibb, "shows the marks of rehandling", but it appears that Asad managed to surprise the Türgesh ruler and Ibn Surayj near Kharistan. According to al-Tabari, Asad learned of the dispersal of the Türgesh army when his advance guard, 300 cavalry under Mansur ibn Salim al-Bajali, encountered a Türgesh reconnaissance party of equal size, defeated it, and took a few Türgesh prisoner. Asad then marched on, encamping first in the village of al-Sidrah, then at Kharistan, (Note: Identified by Gibb with San, a town in the mountains near Maymanah.) until he finally reached a site some two farsakhs—roughly 10–12 kilometres (6–7 miles)—from the capital of Juzjan.

According to the report of Amr ibn Musa, relayed by al-Tabari, Asad gave command of his battle line to al-Qasim ibn Bukhayt al-Muraghi. The latter placed the Azdi and Tamimi tribal contingents, as well as the ruler of Juzjan and his personal retinue (shakiriyya) and the contingents of the Syrian districts of Filastin (under Mus'ab ibn Amr al-Khuza'i) and Qinnasrin (under Maghra ibn Ahmar al-Numayri) on the right, while the left was held by the Rabi'ah tribe (under Yahya ibn Hudayn) and the contingent of the districts of Homs (under Ja'far ibn Hanzalah al-Bahrani) and Jordan (under Sulayman ibn Amr al-Muqri). Mansur al-Bajali commanded the vanguard as before, reinforced by the troops of the district of Damascus (under Hamlah ibn Nu'aym al-Kalbi) and the personal retinue of Asad. The khagan, who had only 4,000 of his men with him, placed Ibn Surayj and his followers on the right, while the rest of his force consisted of his Türgesh and of contingents from the princes of Transoxiana—al-Tabari implies they were there in person, but this is unlikely—including the rulers of Sughd, Shash (Tashkent), Usrushana, Khuttal, and the Yabghu of Tokharistan.

In the ensuing clash, the Türgesh right under Ibn Surayj was victorious, reportedly reaching Asad's tent. However, after the Arabs attacked from the rear—reportedly on the suggestion of the ruler of Juzjan—the Türgesh and their allies broke and fled. In their flight, the Türgesh abandoned their encampment with their women, including the wife of the khaghan; she was stabbed by a eunuch servant to prevent her from being taken captive. The Umayyads also recovered the enormous spoils taken by the Türgesh, including 155,000 sheep, "every kind of silver vessel", and many Muslim captives. Suluk barely managed to escape, as his horse got stuck in the mud. Fortunately for him, the Muslims did not recognize him, and he was rescued by Ibn Surayj.

Asad divided the spoils among his men, sending the captive Türgesh women to the local Iranian landed nobility, the dehgans. He remained at the site of his victory for five days, before returning to Balkh, nine days after his departure. From there he set out for Jazzah, where the khagan had fled. Suluk fled before the Umayyad pursuit, but the Arabs were soon hampered by heavy rain and snow, allowing the khagan and Ibn Surayj to escape to Upper Tokharistan, whence they moved on to Usrushana. The Türgesh raiding parties left behind in Khurasan were captured or destroyed one by one by Asad and his officers, and only a few Sogdians managed to escape back across the Oxus.

== Aftermath ==
"On this skirmish at Kharistan, for it was little more, hung the fate of Arab rule, not only in Transoxania, but possibly even in Khurasan, at least for the immediate future. [...] Kharistan was not only the turning point in the fortunes of the Arabs in Central Asia, but gave the signal for the downfall of the Turgesh power, which was bound up with the personal prestige of [Suluk]."

— H. A. R. Gibb.

Asad's resolution in confronting the khagan, and the wise strategic choice of making Balkh his residence, paid off, and allowed him to salvage a situation that, in the wake of several defeats at the hands of the Türgesh, had appeared seemingly hopeless—indeed, the Umayyad caliph, Hisham ibn Abd al-Malik (r. 724–743), is said to have been incredulous at the first news of Asad's victory. The victory at Kharistan consolidated the Arab position in Khurasan, and particularly in Tokharistan, where the remaining loyal native rulers would certainly have gone over to the Türgesh if the latter had won or remained unopposed. Conversely the defeat diminished the prestige of Suluk, and may possibly have played a role in his assassination early in 738, although rivalries between the Türgesh, fanned by the Chinese court, were more directly responsible for this. The Türgesh khaganate then collapsed into infighting, and stopped being a serious threat to Umayyad interests in the area. As a result, the Battle of Kharistan is considered a turning point for Muslim fortunes in Central Asia.

After 739 under Asad's successor, Nasr ibn Sayyar, the Umayyad armies moved eastward in order to capture Shash but were prevented from crossing the Jaxartes by a coalition of Türgesh troops, contingents from Shash, and followers of al-Harith. However, Nasr recovered most of Transoxiana by c. 743, and with the Battle of Talas in 751 and the turmoil of the An Shi Rebellion, which terminated Chinese influence in Central Asia, Muslim dominance in the region was secured. Nevertheless, the losses suffered by the Syrians under Asad's command in the 737 campaign in Khuttal were of particularly grave importance in the long term, as the Syrian army was the main pillar of the Umayyad regime. Its numerical decline in Khurasan meant that the Khurasan-born Arabs could no longer be completely controlled by force; this opened the way not only for the appointment of a native Khurasani Arab governor in the person of Nasr ibn Sayyar, but also, eventually, for the outbreak of the Abbasid Revolution that toppled the Umayyad regime.

== Sources ==
- Blankinship, Khalid Yahya, ed. (1989). The History of al-Ṭabarī, Volume XXV: The End of Expansion: The Caliphate of Hishām, A.D. 724–738/A.H. 105–120. SUNY Series in Near Eastern Studies. Albany, New York: State University of New York Press. ISBN 978-0-88706-569-9.
- Blankinship, Khalid Yahya (1994). The End of the Jihâd State: The Reign of Hishām ibn ʻAbd al-Malik and the Collapse of the Umayyads. Albany, New York: State University of New York Press. ISBN 978-0-7914-1827-7.
- Gibb, H. A. R. (1923). The Arab Conquests in Central Asia. London: The Royal Asiatic Society.
- Hartmann, R. (1965). "Djūzdjān". In Lewis, B.; Pellat, Ch. & Schacht, J. (eds.). The Encyclopaedia of Islam, Second Edition. Volume II: C–G. Leiden: E. J. Brill. pp. 608–609. OCLC 495469475.
- Hawting, Gerald R. (2000). The First Dynasty of Islam: The Umayyad Caliphate AD 661–750 (Second ed.). London and New York: Routledge. ISBN 0-415-24072-7.
- Sims-Williams, Nicholas (2002). "Nouveaux documents bactriens du Guzgan (note d'information)" [New Bactrian documents of Guzgan (informational note)]. Comptes rendus des séances de l'Académie des Inscriptions et Belles-Lettres (in French). 146 (3): 1047–1058. doi:10.3406/crai.2002.22500.
