= Battle of Baykand =

729 battle of the Muslim conquest of Transoxiana

- Part of the Muslim conquest of Transoxiana
- Map of Khurasan and Transoxiana in the 8th century
Date	729
Location	Poykent and Bukhara (modern Uzbekistan) 39.662°N 64.071°E
Result	Umayyad victory

Belligerents
Umayyad Caliphate	Türgesh Khaganate; Bukhar Khudahs

Commanders and leaders
Ashras ibn Abdallah al-Sulami; Qatan ibn Qutayba; Thabit Qutnah; Al-Harith ibn Surayj; Ghurak	Suluk

The Battle of Baykand was fought in 729 between the Turkic Türgesh khaganate and its Soghdian allies and the Arabs of the Umayyad Caliphate at Baykand, a town near Bukhara in Transoxiana (in modern Uzbekistan). The Arab army, under the governor of Khurasan Ashras ibn Abdallah al-Sulami, campaigned across the Oxus River to suppress a large-scale rebellion of the subject Soghdian princes that had broken out the previous year and received Türgesh support. As the Arab army advanced on Bukhara, it was encircled by the Türgesh and cut off from water. A series of engagements followed that almost ended in a disaster for the Arabs like the "Day of Thirst" five years earlier, but in the end, through the inspirational bravery of a few Arab leaders and the actions of the vanguard under al-Harith ibn Surayj and Qatan ibn Qutayba, the Arabs broke through and reached Bukhara, which they laid siege to.

== Background ==
The region of Transoxiana had been conquered by the Umayyad leader Qutayba ibn Muslim in the reign of al-Walid I (r. 705–715), following the Muslim conquests of Persia and Khurasan in the mid-7th century. The loyalties of Transoxiana's native Iranian and Turkic populations and of the autonomous local rulers remained questionable, however: in 719 the Transoxianian princes sent a petition to the Chinese court and their Türgesh vassals for military aid against the Umayyad Caliphate's governors. In response, from 720 on the Türgesh launched a series of attacks against the Muslims in Transoxiana, coupled with uprisings against the Caliphate among the local Sogdians. The Umayyad governors initially managed to suppress the unrest, although control over the Ferghana Valley was lost. In 724 governor Muslim ibn Sa'id al-Kilabi and his army suffered a heavy defeat (the so-called "Day of Thirst") at the hands of the Türgesh when he tried to subdue Ferghana. This defeat pushed the Arabs on the defensive, and even though no pitched battles took place, over the next few years the Arab position in Transoxiana collapsed swiftly.

== Ashras al-Sulami's campaign ==
Faced with this crisis, Caliph Hisham ibn Abd al-Malik (r. 723–743) took drastic measures: Khurasan was separated from the purview of the governor of Iraq and raised to a separate province, under the Jaziran general Ashras ibn Abdallah al-Sulami. Like his predecessor, Asad ibn Abdallah al-Qasri, Ashras tried to win over the loyalties of the local population and the native, non-Arab converts to Islam (mawali) by addressing some of their grievances on taxation. Soon, however, this policy was reversed—possibly due to pressure from the Caliph himself—and the often brutal measures the Arab tax-gatherers employed to gather the taxes from the mawali and the local landed aristocracy (dihqans) led to a general revolt in Transoxiana. This was made all the more dangerous to the Arabs due to the rebels' call for assistance to the Türgesh ruler, the khagan, who replied by leading his army in person against the Arabs. By the time the khagan entered the field in 728, only Samarkand and the two fortresses of Kamarja and Dabusiyya on the Zarafshan River remained in Arab hands in all of Transoxiana.

In order to confront the Türgesh, Ashras assembled the forces of Khurasan and led them to Amul on the Oxus River. A vanguard under Qatan, son of Qutayba ibn Muslim, was sent over the river and established a fortified camp, but with the arrival of the combined native Soghdian and Türgesh armies, the bulk of the Arab force was unable to cross for three months. During this period Qatan's force was beleaguered by the Türgesh, who at the same time crossed the Oxus in small raiding parties. Ashras gave command of his cavalry to Thabit Qutnah, who managed to rout the raiders and drive them to Amul. There the Arabs defeated the Türgesh, although a decisive victory eluded them as Türgesh reinforcements crossed the river and allowed the raiders to escape to safety back over the Oxus. At length Ashras got his forces across, linked up with Qatan ibn Qutayba, and began to advance on Bukhara. The Arabs beat off attacks to reach the trading town of Baykand, some five farsakhs—roughly 30 kilometres (19 miles)—south of Bukhara itself and outside the oasis that surrounded the latter. After the Arab army encamped at Baykand, the Türgesh and Soghdians cut off the water supply from the oasis.

Threatened with thirst, the Arab army left Baykand and headed for Bukhara, with Qatan in the vanguard. When the Türgesh and Soghdian forces attacked, the vanguard, some 6,000 men, was cut off from the main body under Ashras, and Ashras and Qatan gave each other up for lost until they met again two days later. The king of Samarkand, Ghurak, who had unto this moment remained ostensibly loyal to the Arabs—although, ever careful to hedge his bets, he had sent his son Mukhtar to the khagan—now switched sides. Exhausted by thirst, the Arab vanguard was almost cut down by their enemies, losing 700 men. At this point, according to the account preserved by al-Tabari, the Tamimi warrior al-Harith ibn Surayj, who was later to lead a widespread revolt in Khurasan, urged the Arabs forward, crying that "being killed by the sword is nobler in (this) world and greater in reward with God than death by thirst". Encouraged by his example, the Tamimi and Qaysi cavalry under al-Harith and Qatan broke through the Türgesh lines and reached the water sources, narrowly staving off a second "Day of Thirst" and allowing Ashras to continue his advance towards Bukhara.

== Aftermath ==
Following the series of battles around Baykand, the Türgesh retired north to Samarkand, where they assaulted the fortress of Kamarja, while Ashras with his troops besieged Bukhara and wintered in its oasis. Warfare did not die down, however, and the Arabs' situation remained precarious. In early 730, Ashras' newly appointed successor Junayd ibn Abd al-Rahman al-Murri tried to reach the army, which was still encamped in the Bukhara oasis, he had to be escorted from Amul by 7,000 cavalry who were attacked on the way by the Türgesh and almost destroyed. Although Bukhara was recovered by the Arabs at this time, either under Ashras or under Junayd, in the very next year the latter led the Khurasani army to disaster in the Battle of the Defile, an event which shattered the tenuous Arab control over what remained of their possessions in Transoxiana. The Arabs were not able to recover their position until the governorship of Nasr ibn Sayyar, who in 739–741 managed to re-establish the Caliphate's authority up to Samarkand.

== Sources ==
- Blankinship, Khalid Yahya, ed. (1989). The History of al-Ṭabarī, Volume XXV: The End of Expansion: The Caliphate of Hishām, A.D. 724–738/A.H. 105–120. SUNY Series in Near Eastern Studies. Albany, New York: State University of New York Press. ISBN 978-0-88706-569-9.
- Blankinship, Khalid Yahya (1994). The End of the Jihâd State: The Reign of Hishām ibn ʻAbd al-Malik and the Collapse of the Umayyads. Albany, New York: State University of New York Press. ISBN 978-0-7914-1827-7.
- Gibb, H. A. R. (1923). The Arab Conquests in Central Asia. London: The Royal Asiatic Society.
