= Princes of Khuttal =

Iranian dynasty which ruled the Khuttal region of central Asia from the 600s to 750 AD

Principality of Khuttal
- before 676–750/1
- Map of Khurasan, Transoxiana and Tokharistan
- Status: Autonomous principality, at times client of the Umayyads and the Turgesh
- Capital: Hulbuk
- Government: Monarchy
- Khuttalan Shah
- Historical era: Middle Ages
  - Established: before 676
  - Abbasid conquest: 750/1

The Princes of Khuttal (also spelled Khatlan and Khotlan) were an Iranian-speaking dynasty, which ruled the Khuttal region from the early 7th century to 750. The rulers of the region were known by their titles of “Khuttalan Shah” (king of Khuttal), “Khuttalan Khudah” (lord of Khuttal), and “Shir-i Khutallan” (lion of Khuttal). The capital and residence of the rulers was in Hulbuk, close to the city of Kulob.

== History ==
Khuttal, along with other regions, was originally under Hephthalite rule, but as the Hephthalite kingdom began to weaken, local dynasties in Khuttal, Chaghaniyan, and other regions, began to assert their rule over them. In ca. 676, Sa'id ibn 'Uthman, the Umayyad Arab governor of Khurasan, managed to make the principality of Khuttal acknowledge Muslim authority. However, this did not effect actual Arab rule over Khuttal and the principality remained independent. In ca. 699, a Khuttalan pretender who was the paternal cousin of the Khuttalan king, known in Arabic sources as al-Sabal, fled to the Arab general al-Muhallab ibn Abi Suffrah, and urged him to invade the principality. The latter agreed, provided the pretender with an army to invade the region, and sent another army under his son Yazid ibn al-Muhallab. However, al-Sabal managed to make a surprise attack on the Khuttalan pretender, and had him executed at his fortress. Yazid shortly after besieged the fortress, but made peace with al-Sabal in return for a ransom of money. In 727, another Arab general, Asad ibn Abdallah al-Qasri, invaded Khuttal, but al-Sabal called upon the Turkic Turgesh for aid, who, under their khagan Suluk, won a decisive victory over Asad in the so-called "Day of Thirst".

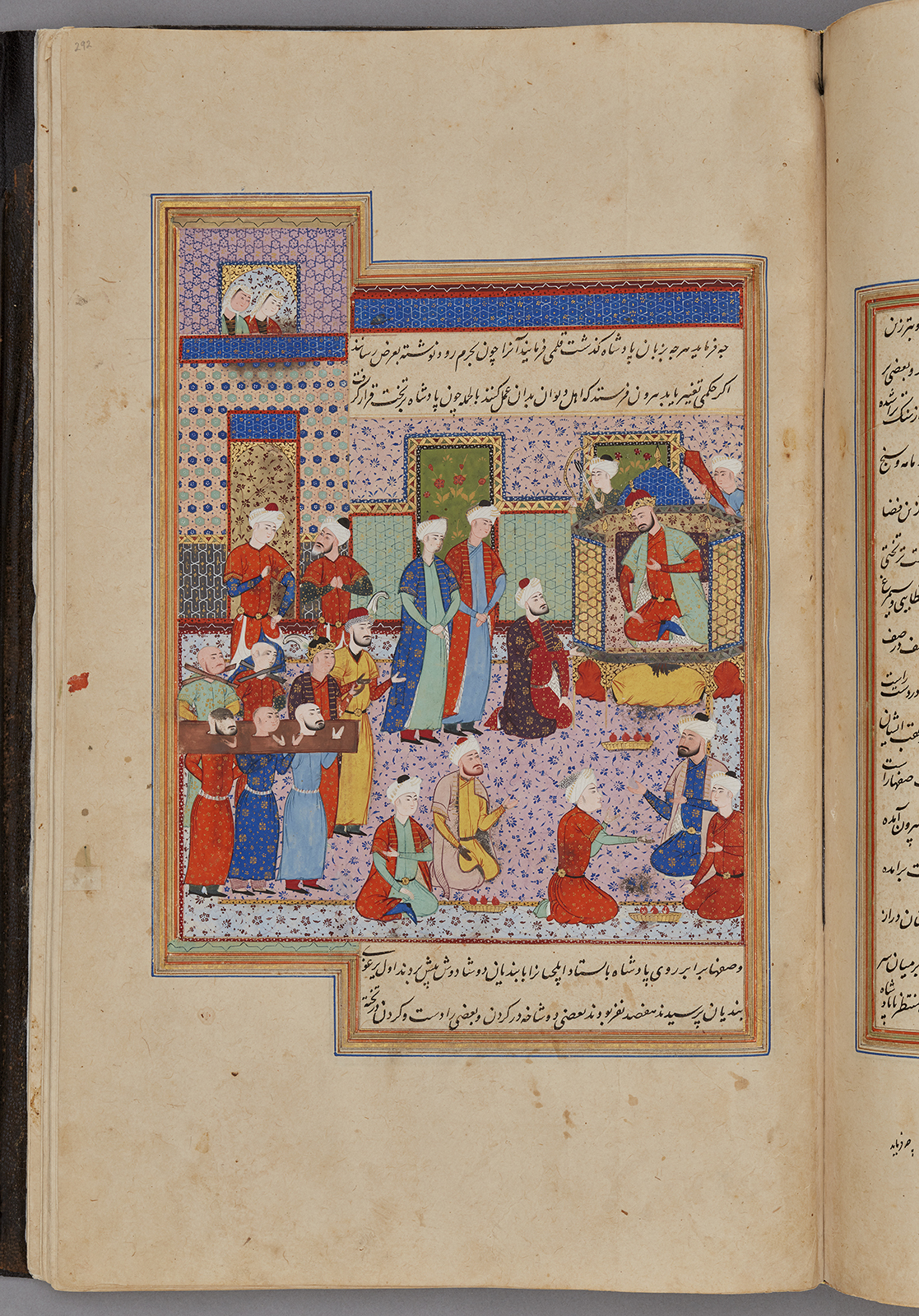
"Prisoners and messengers before the ruler of Khutalan". Folio from a manuscript of Nigaristan, Iran, probably Shiraz, dated 1573-74

Al-Sabal, shortly before his death, appointed a Khuttalan nobleman known in Arabic sources as Ibn al-Sa'iji as the regent of his principality until his son, known in Arabic sources as al-Hanash, and in Chinese sources as Lo-kin-tsie, who had fled to China, returned to Khuttal. Ibn al-Sa'iji is mentioned in supporting and having made an alliance with the Arab military leader al-Harith ibn Surayj during his rebellion in Khurasan, but the two soon quarrelled and Harith withdrew with his followers into Tokharistan. Because of this, in 737 Asad, once more governor of Khurasan, carried out another invasion of Khuttal, which made Ibn al-Sa'iji, like his predecessor, call upon the Turgesh for aid. The khagan Suluk, at the head of an army numbering 50,000 men, attacked Asad, and inflicted a heavy defeat on him (30 September 737). However, later in the same year, Asad managed to inflict a heavy defeat on Suluk, who barely escaped capture and was forced to retire north to his lands. There he was soon after murdered by his rivals, leading to the collapse of Turgesh power amid civil war. In the aftermath of the battle, a certain prince named Badr Tarkhan, who may have been the ruler of Bamiyan, conquered Khuttal. Thereupon Asad invaded Khuttal and forced the principality to acknowledge Umayyad authority.

In 750, the Umayyad Caliphate fell, and was replaced by the Abbasid Caliphate, who, under their general Abu Muslim Khorasani, sent Abu Dawud Khalid ibn Ibrahim, the governor of Balkh, to invade the region and bring it under direct Abbasid rule. When Abu Dawud invaded Khuttal, its ruler, known in Arabic sources as Hanash ibn al-Subul (also called Hubaysh ibn al-Shibl) did not resist the invasion, but the dehqans of Khuttal forcibly detained him and carried him to a fortress in order to fight Abu Dawud. Nevertheless, Abu Dawud managed to make Hanash and his dehqans leave the fortress. Hanash shortly fled to the court of the Turks, and then to the Chinese court, while Abu Dawud consolidated Abbasid rule in Khuttal, marking the end of the principality.

== See also ==
- Khatlon Region
- Principality of Chaghaniyan
- Principality of Ushrusana
- Bukhar Khudahs
- Principality of Farghana

== Sources ==
- Bosworth, C.E. (1986). "Khuttalān". In Bosworth, C. E.; van Donzel, E.; Lewis, B. & Pellat, Ch. (eds.). The Encyclopaedia of Islam, Second Edition. Volume V: Khe–Mahi. Leiden: E. J. Brill. pp. 75–76. ISBN 978-90-04-07819-2.
- Blankinship, Khalid Yahya (1994). The End of the Jihâd State: The Reign of Hishām ibn ʻAbd al-Malik and the Collapse of the Umayyads. Albany, New York: State University of New York Press. ISBN 978-0-7914-1827-7.
- Gibb, H. A. R. (1923). The Arab Conquests in Central Asia. London: The Royal Asiatic Society. OCLC 499987512.
- Bosworth, C. Edmund (2009). "ḴOTTAL". Encyclopædia Iranica, Online edition.
