= Ibrahim ibn Asim al-Uqayli =

Military commander

Ibrahim ibn Asim al-Uqayli (Arabic: إبراهيم بن عاصم العقيلي; died 743/44) was a military commander of the Umayyad Caliphate and governor of Sistan.

Ibrahim ibn Asim al-Uqayli hailed from the Jazira, and belonged to the Banu Uqayl tribe of the Qays. He served as a commander in Khurasan against the Turgesh under both Asim ibn Abdallah al-Hilali and later under Asad ibn Abdallah al-Qasri. Under Asad he commanded the eponymous baggage train in the Battle of the Baggage in September 737, a heavy defeat for the Muslims.

He was appointed governor of Sistan by the governor of Iraq, Yusuf ibn Umar al-Thaqafi. On his arrival in his province in July 738, on Yusuf's urging, he either killed his predecessor, Ibn Abi Burda, and seized his property, or imprisoned him and sent him to Iraq where Yusuf killed him under torture. Ibrahim died in office in 743/4.

== Sources ==
- Blankinship, Khalid Yahya, ed. (1989). The History of al-Ṭabarī, Volume XXV: The End of Expansion: The Caliphate of Hishām, A.D. 724–738/A.H. 105–120. SUNY Series in Near Eastern Studies. Albany, New York: State University of New York Press. ISBN 978-0-88706-569-9.
- Blankinship, Khalid Yahya (1994). The End of the Jihâd State: The Reign of Hishām ibn ʻAbd al-Malik and the Collapse of the Umayyads. Albany, New York: State University of New York Press. ISBN 978-0-7914-1827-7.
- Crone, Patricia (1980). Slaves on Horses: The Evolution of the Islamic Polity. Cambridge: Cambridge University Press. ISBN 0-521-52940-9.
