= Principality of Chaghaniyan =

Ancient state

- Location of the Principality of Chaghaniyan

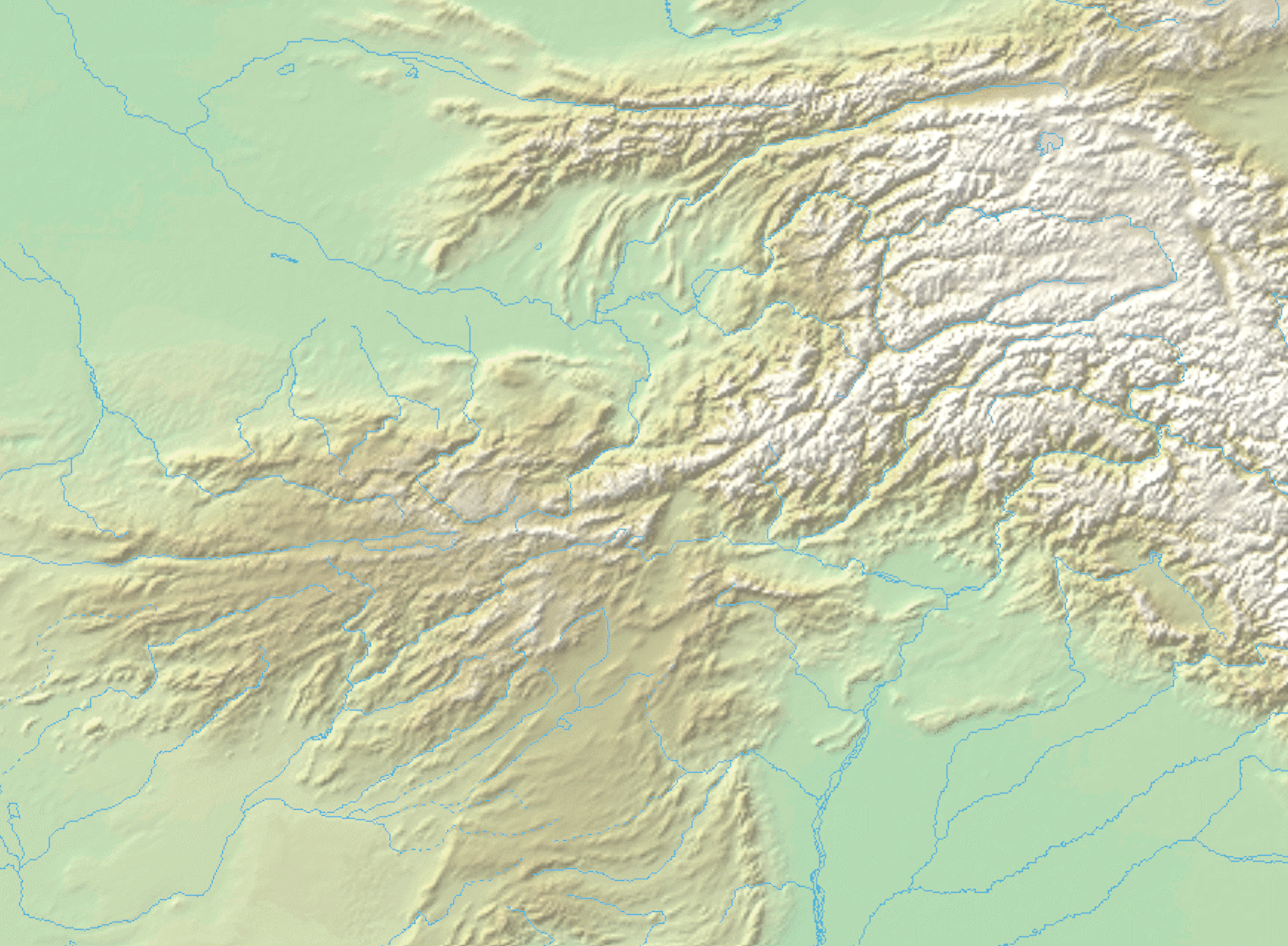
- Principality of Chaghaniyan and neighbouring cities
- Religion: Buddhism, Zoroastrianism
- Government: Monarchy
- Historical era: 5th-10th century CE
Preceded by
Kidarites; Alchon Huns

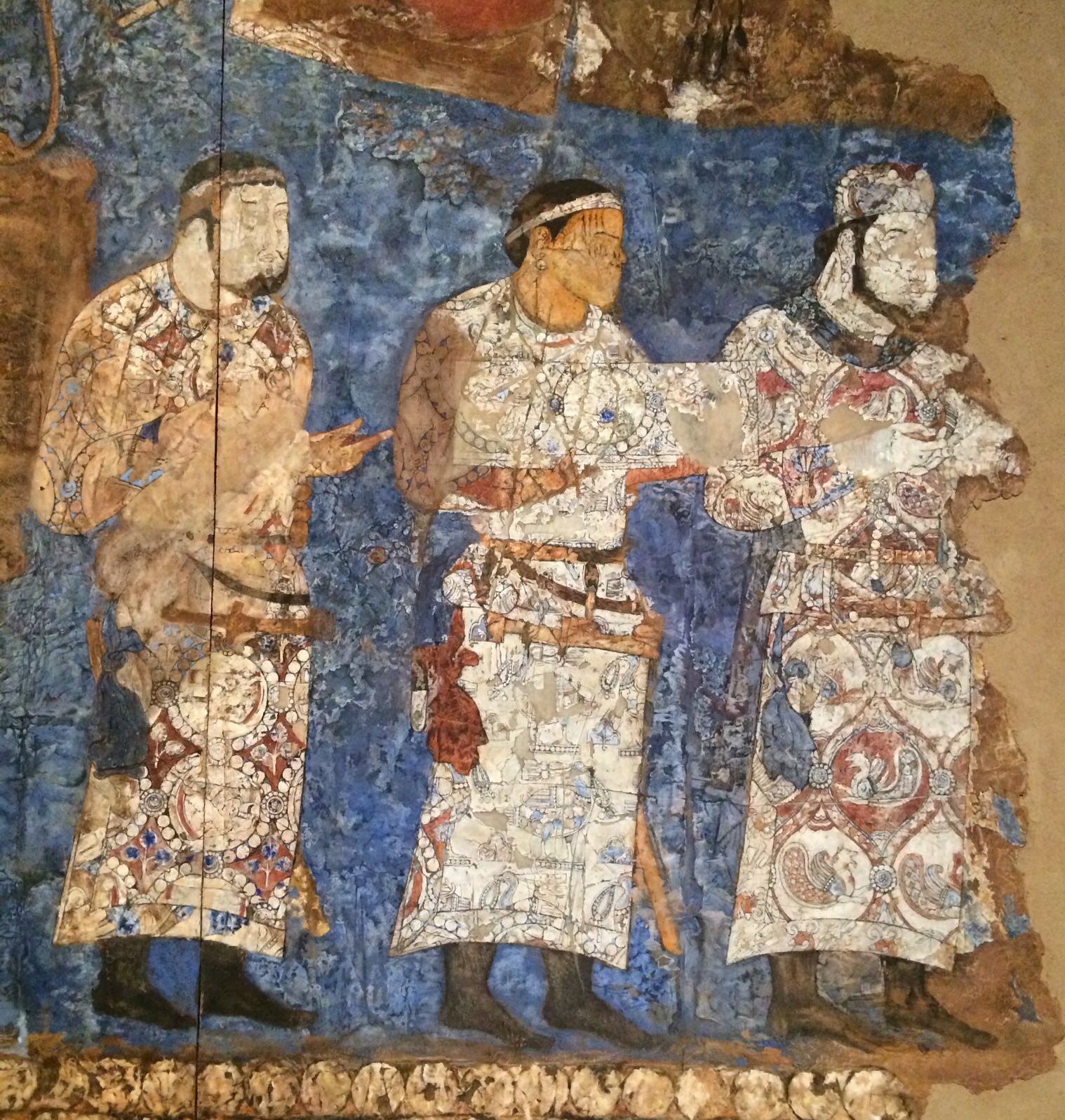
Ambassador from Chaganian (central figure, inscription of the neck), and ambassadors from Chach (modern Tashkent) to king Varkhuman of Samarkand. 648-651 CE, Afrasiyab murals, Samarkand.

The Principality of Chaghaniyan, known in Arabic sources as al-Saghaniyan, was a part of the Hephthalite Confederation from the 5th to the 7th century CE. After this, it was ruled by a local, presumably Iranian dynasty, which governed the Chaghaniyan region from the late 7th-century to the early 8th-century CE. These rulers were known by their titles of “Chaghan Khudah” (Middle Iranian; Čagīnīgān Xvaday, meaning “the lord of Chaghaniyan”).

== Known Rulers ==
- Faghanish (570s), Founder.

-Turantash (650s), Sent ambassador to Varkhuman.

- Tikh (710s), Collaborated with Tughshada.

== History ==
=== Hephthalite rule ===
The Hephthalite Empire fragmented around 560 CE under the assault of the Western Turks and the Sasanian Empire. After this time, the area around the Oxus in Bactria contained numerous Hephthalites principalities, remnants of the great Hephthalite Empire. They are reported in the Zarafshan valley, Chaghaniyan, Khuttal, Termez, Balkh, Badghis, Herat and Kabul. In Chaghaniyan, the local ruler was named Faganish, and he started a dynasty.

Circa 648-651 CE, the ruler of Chaghaniyan known as Turantash, sent an embassy under his chancellor Pukarzate to Varkhuman, the Sogdian king of Samarkand. The visit is mentioned in the murals of Afrasiyab, written in Sogdian:

When King Varkhuman Unash came to him [the ambassador] opened his mouth [and said thus]: "I am Pukarzate, the dapirpat (chancellor) of Chaganian. I arrived here from Turantash, the lord of Chaganian, to Samarkand, to the king, and with respect [to] the king [now] I am [here]. And with regard to me do not have any misgivings: about the gods of Samarkand, as well as about the writing of Samarkand I am keenly aware, and I also have not done any harm to the king. Let you be quite fortunate!" And King Varkhuman Unash took leave [of him]. And [then] the dapirpat (chancellor) of Chach opened his mouth.

— Inscription on an ambassador's robe.

The King of Chaganian named Turantash may have a been a "Hunnic" Hephthalite ruler, or one of the local Chaghan Khudah, who seem to have coexisted with the Hephthalites.

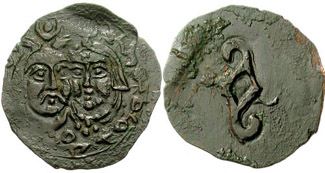
Hephthalite coin of the Principality of Chaghaniyan, with crowned King and Queen, in Byzantine fashion, circa 550-650 CE. Legend in Sogdian.

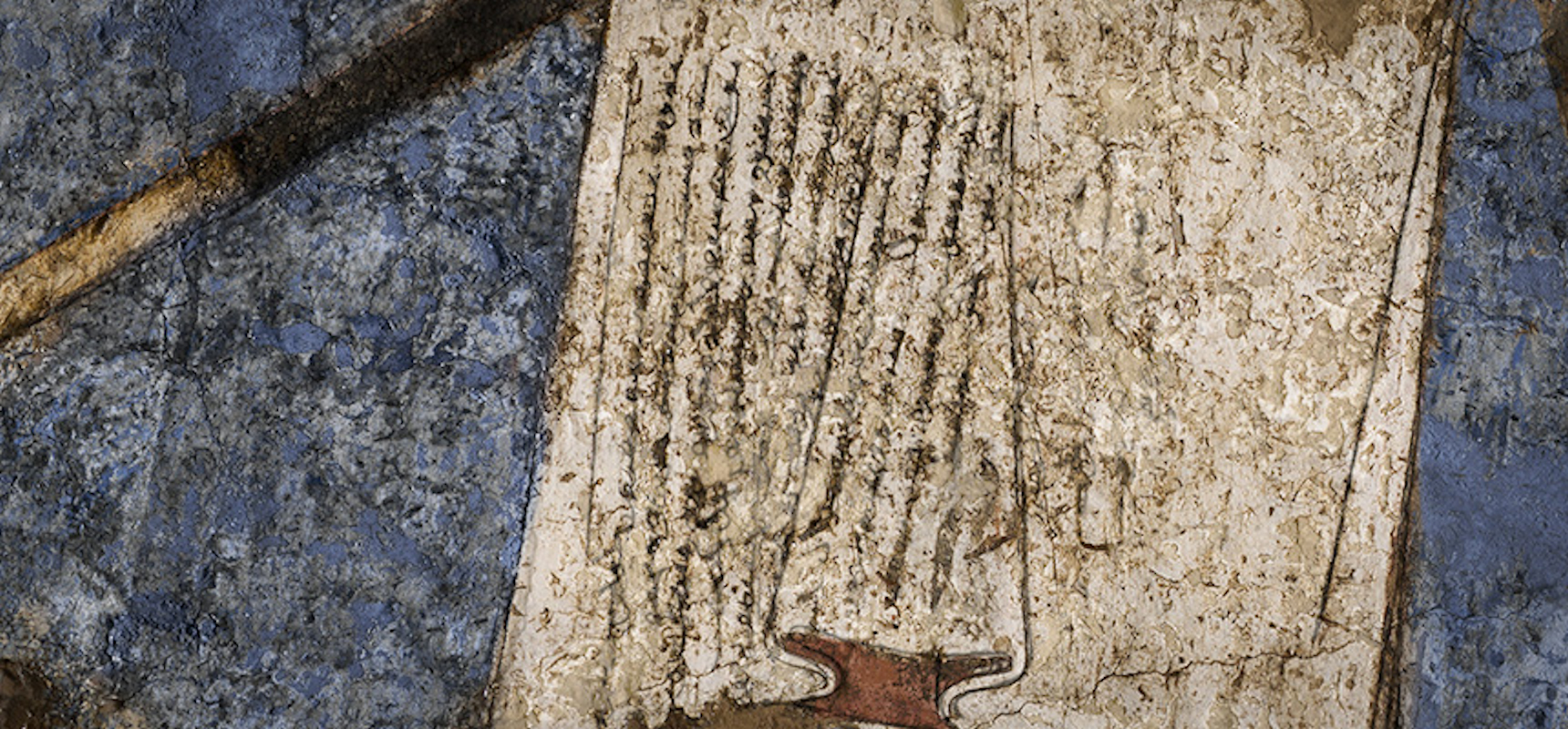
Afrasiab Sogdian inscription mentioning the embassy of Turantash

=== Chaghan Khudah rule ===
During the late 7th-century CE, Chaghaniyan became independent from Hephthalite rule, and came under the control of presumably Iranian local rulers known as the “Chaghan Khudah”. During the Muslim conquest of Persia, the Chaghan Khudah aided the Sasanians, during their struggle against the Rashidun Arabs. However, the Arabs, after having dealt with the Sasanian Empire, began focusing on the local rulers of Khorasan, which included the Chaghan Khudah and many other local rulers. In 652, the Chaghan Khudah, along with the rulers of Talaqan, Guzgan, and Faryab, aided the ruler of southern Tokharistan against the Arabs. Nevertheless the Arabs managed to emerge victorious during the battle. However, the Rashidun Caliphate soon fell into civil war, and was conquered by another Arab family, who founded the Umayyad Caliphate.

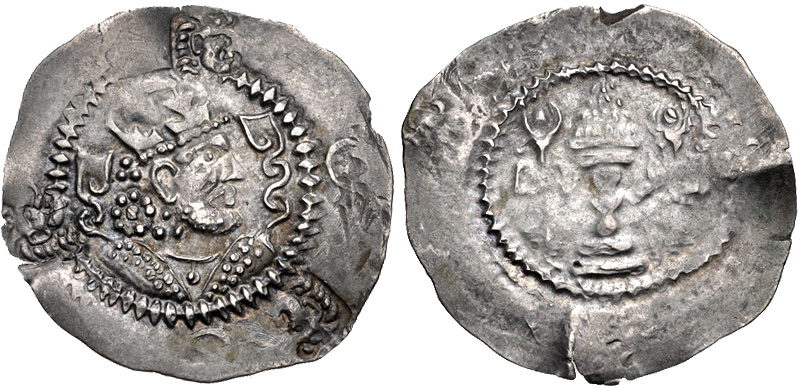
Coin of an uncertain Chaghan Khudah, in Sasanian style. Chaghaniyan, 7th century CE

In 705, the Arab general Qutayba ibn Muslim managed to make the Chaghan Khudah, whose name is mentioned as Tish, acknowledge Umayyad authority. The real reason for Tish's submission, however, was to gain aid in defeating the local rulers of Akharun and Shuman in northern Tokharistan, who had been making incursions against him. Qutayba shortly defeated the two rulers, and forced them to acknowledge Umayyad authority.

However, in 718, Tish, along with Gurak, the king of Samarkand, Narayana, the king of Kumadh, and Tughshada, the Bukhar Khudah of Bukhara, sent an embassy to the Tang dynasty of China, where they asked for aid against the Arabs. Nevertheless, the principality of Chaghaniyan still aided the Arabs against the Turgesh, and were present at the side of the Arabs during the Battle of the Baggage, where they were defeated and the Chaghan Khudah was killed. After the battle, most of Khorasan except Chaghaniyan remained under Arab control. Under Nasr ibn Sayyar, Chaghaniyan was once again a vassal of the Umayyad Caliphate. After this, the Chaghan Khudahs begin to fade from the sources. In the late 8th-century Chaghaniyan fell under the direct control of the Abbasid Caliphate, which had succeeded the Umayyad Caliphate in 750. The Muhtajids, an Iranian dynasty which in the 10th-century gained control over Chaghaniyan, may have been descended from the Chaghan Khudahs.

== Notes ==
a: Also spelled Chaghan Khuda, Chaghan Khoda, and Saghan Khuda,

== See also ==
- Principality of Khuttal
- Principality of Farghana
- Principality of Ushrusana

== Sources ==
- Bosworth, C. E. (1986). "Ḳutayba b. Muslim". In Bosworth, C. E.; van Donzel, E.; Lewis, B. & Pellat, Ch. (eds.). The Encyclopaedia of Islam, Second Edition. Volume V: Khe–Mahi. Leiden: E. J. Brill. pp. 541–542. ISBN 978-90-04-07819-2.
- Gibb, H. A. R. (1923). The Arab Conquests in Central Asia. London: The Royal Asiatic Society. OCLC 499987512.
- Shaban, M. A. (1979). The 'Abbāsid Revolution. Cambridge: Cambridge University Press. ISBN 0-521-29534-3.
- Blankinship, Khalid Yahya, ed. (1989). The History of al-Ṭabarī, Volume XXV: The End of Expansion: The Caliphate of Hishām, A.D. 724–738/A.H. 105–120. SUNY Series in Near Eastern Studies. Albany, New York: State University of New York Press. ISBN 978-0-88706-569-9.
- Blankinship, Khalid Yahya (1994). The End of the Jihâd State: The Reign of Hishām ibn ʻAbd al-Malik and the Collapse of the Umayyads. Albany, New York: State University of New York Press. ISBN 978-0-7914-1827-7.
- B. A. Litvinsky, Ahmad Hasan Dani (1996). History of Civilizations of Central Asia: The crossroads of civilizations, A.D. 250 to 750. UNESCO. pp. 1–569. ISBN 9789231032110.
- Wellhausen, Julius (1927). The Arab Kingdom and Its Fall. University of Calcutta.
- Bosworth, C. Edmund (1990). "ČAḠĀNĪĀN". Encyclopaedia Iranica, Vol. IV, Fasc. 6. London et al.: C. Edmund Bosworth. pp. 614–615.
- Bosworth, C. Edmund (1984). "ĀL-E MOḤTĀJ". Encyclopaedia Iranica, Vol. I, Fasc. 7. London et al.: C. Edmund Bosworth. pp. 764–766.
- Hansen, Valerie (2012). The Silk Road. Oxford University Press. pp. 1–304. ISBN 9780195159318. "Diwashini."
