= Defile =

Defile may refer to:

- Defile (geography), in geography, a narrow pass or gorge between mountains
- Defile (military), to march off in a line
- Ritual uncleanliness
- The Defile, a pass between Suess Glacier and Nussbaum Riegel in Victoria Land, Antarctica
- Tom DeFile, bassist from Saigon Kick

== See also ==
- Battle of the Defile or Battle of the Pass, 731 battle between the Umayyads and Turks
