= Al-Harith ibn Surayj =

Arab rebel leader in Khurasan (died 746)

- الحارث بن سريج
- Died: March 746; Marw
- Years active: 729–746
- Known for: Leader of anti-Umayyad social and religious (Murji'ah) rebellion in Khurasan and Transoxiana

Abu Hatim al-Harith ibn Surayj ibn Yazid (Arabic: أبو حاتم الحارث بن سريج بن يزيد, romanized: Abū Ḥātim al-Ḥārith ibn Surayj ibn Yazīd) was an Arab leader of a large-scale social rebellion against the Umayyad Caliphate in Khurasan and Transoxiana. Harith's rebellion began in 734 and represented the grievances of both the local Arab settlers as well as the native Iranian converts (mawali), who were not recognized as equal to the Arab Muslims, against the Umayyad regime. Harith based his revolt on religious grounds and won over a large part of both the Arab settlers and the native population, but failed twice to capture the provincial capital of Marw. The rebellion was finally suppressed by Asad ibn Abdallah al-Qasri in 736. Along with a few supporters, Harith escaped capture and allied himself with the heathen Türgesh. Harith accompanied the Türgesh qaghan Suluk in his invasion deep into Arab-held territory, which was decisively beaten back in the Battle of Kharistan in 737. With Türgesh power collapsing thereafter, Harith remained in Transoxiana supported by the native princes. Asad's successor, Nasr ibn Sayyar, campaigned against Harith and his native supporters, but eventually, hoping to use him to bolster his position in the Arab inter-tribal rivalries, Nasr secured for Harith a pardon from the Caliph. Harith returned to Marw in 745. Soon however he raised a sizeable armed force and challenged Nasr's authority, until he was killed in a clash with his ally Juday al-Kirmani in 746. His revolt weakened Arab power in Central Asia and facilitated the beginning of the Abbasid Revolution that would overthrow the Umayyads.

== Biography ==
=== Early life and start of the rebellion ===
Harith was from the Tamim tribe belonging to the north Arab (Mudari) tribal supergroup, and hailed from Basra, where his father, Surayj, lived. He is first mentioned in 729, when he distinguished himself for his bravery and self-sacrifice against the Türgesh, saving the Arab army from annihilation at Baykand near Bukhara. Harith is next mentioned in 733, when he led a protest in Lower Tokharistan against the commandeering of supplies from the province, already plagued by drought and famine, to feed the capital of Khurasan at Marw, by the governor Junayd ibn Abd al-Rahman al-Murri. Junayd had Harith flogged, but after Junayd died in early 734, the discontent erupted into an open rebellion, with Harith at its head.

Map of Khurasan and Transoxiana in the 8th century.

The motives and nature of Harith's rebellion are debated. His public demands were phrased in religious terms, demanding the end of injustice through the "application of the Book and the Sunnah" by the government. Harith himself is said to have been a member of the obscure pietistic group known as Murji'a, and to have led an ascetic life. In the words of the Arabist Meir J. Kister, he apparently had "a feeling of mission" and aimed to establish a "just government resembling that of the Prophet and the first Caliphs". His movement shared many ideological and symbolic elements with contemporary Shi'ite and Kharijite agitation directed against the Umayyad regime, including the use of black flags hearkening back to the banner of the Prophet and even the demand for theocratic rule by a member of the Prophet's family. Harith's movement was marked by an unusual idealism, however, and it is recorded that his adherents tried to persuade their opponents to join them through moral and religious invocations even during battles.

Harith advocated various reforms, the most prominent being the full legal equality of the native non-Arab converts (mawali) with the Arab Muslims, echoing a long-standing demand of the former, in conformity with the precepts of Islam. This had been attempted twice before, by the Caliph Umar ibn Abd al-Aziz (r. 717–720) and by the governors Asad ibn Abdallah al-Qasri and Ashras ibn Abdallah al-Sulami, but both times the resulting rise in conversions and concomitant drop in revenue (as the numerous mawali would not have to pay the poll tax) put an end to this, leading to a first rebellion in 728 under Abu al-Sayda Salih ibn Tarif. Many of the groups and individuals associated with this first uprising would also participate in Harith's movement. Harith was seen as a champion of the rights of the ajam (non-Arabs, especially Iranians), many of whom flocked to his banner, but he also had a large following from the disaffected among the Arabs themselves, especially his fellow Tamim and the Azd. Disaffection was widespread among the Khurasani Arabs due to the heavy casualties suffered against the Türgesh at the Battle of the Defile in 731, as well as the dissemination of anti-Umayyad propaganda by proto-Shi'ite groups. This was exacerbated by the resentment felt at the introduction of 20,000 Iraqi troops into the province in the aftermath of the Defile, and the parallel order of Caliph Hisham ibn Abd al-Malik (r. 723–743) to disperse the older Arab settlers from Marw to other settlements so as to improve their defence against the Türgesh.

Thus it was that when the news of Junayd's death reached the small town of Andkhuy in Guzgan, one of the remotest Arab outposts, the local Arab garrison followed Harith in rebellion. Junayd's successor, Asim ibn Abdallah al-Hilali, who had just arrived at Marw, tried to placate the rebels and sent emissaries to them, but Harith simply imprisoned them. As the revolt spread through the surrounding countryside, Harith, with a force of 4,000 men, marched on Balkh, the chief city of Tokharistan, held by Nasr ibn Sayyar with 10,000 troops. Although Nasr did not support Harith's movement, such was the level of disaffection among the Khurasanis that he and his men offered little opposition. Balkh was captured by Harith's men with ease, while Nasr and his troops withdrew from the scene and gave their support to neither Harith nor Asim. Soon after that, the Arab garrison at Marw al-Rudh also joined with Harith's forces. The autonomous native Hephthalite princes of Guzgan, Faryab and Talaqan also seized the opportunity to join the revolt with their forces, hoping to re-establish their independence and perhaps reduce the Arab power in Khurasan to a dependent principality around Marw.

Harith now turned his sights on Marw and set out for the capital, where he also had sympathizers. However, Asim managed to cement the loyalty of the wavering Khurasanis by threatening to abandon the city for Naysabur on the western fringes of Khurasan. There he would rely on the Qaysi tribesmen whose loyalty to the Umayyad regime was known, and ask for reinforcements from Syria. Coupled with the presence of the numerous natives in Harith's army, which lent it the appearance of a foreign army, the local Arab elites chose to rally behind Asim. As it neared Marw, Harith's army had swelled to some 60,000 men, as the mawali flocked to his banner, according to the report of al-Tabari. Asim's force was considerably smaller, and less eager: he had to pay them extra money in order to induce them to fight. Nevertheless, he marched out of Marw and took up positions behind a canal at Zarq, destroying its bridges. As Harith's army approached and repaired the bridges, more than 2,000 Arabs from his ranks deserted to Asim, evidently mistrusting the intentions of the native troops of Harith's army. In the subsequent battle, Asim gained a major victory, as many of Harith's troops drowned in the canal. As a result of this failure, most of the mawali and native princes abandoned Harith, whose army was reduced to a loyal core of some 3,000 men. This forced Harith to accept a peace offer from Asim—who likewise could not count on the continued support of the Khurasani Arabs now that the danger from the natives had passed—and retired to Andkhuy. However, in the next year Harith renewed his revolt and marched again on Marw. Asim could not persuade the Khurasanis to fight for him, and was left with only some 1,000 Syrians and Jazirans from his personal guard. Harith's forces were not much larger either, being reduced to the garrison of Marw al-Rudh. In the ensuing battle at the village of al-Dandanqan near Marw, Asim again emerged victorious, forcing Harith to flee to Marw al-Rudh.

Despite his victories, Asim's position was still perilous. He was essentially reduced to Marw and the western, Qaysi regions of Khurasan around Naysabur. In addition, as he explained in a letter to the Caliph, as a Syrian, he faced difficulty in persuading the Khurasanis and even the Iraqi troops to fight under him against one of their own. Asim further requested that Khurasan be placed under the governor of Iraq, Khalid ibn Abdallah al-Qasri, and that Syrian troops be dispatched into the province. In response, Khalid's brother Asad ibn Abdallah al-Qasri, who had already served before as governor of Khurasan, was sent to replace him. News of this, combined probably with pressure from the Khurasanis of Marw, led Asim to again conclude a truce with Harith. According to some accounts, he even agreed to join Harith in demanding from the Caliph the "application of the Book and the Sunna", and join him in revolt should the Caliph refuse. Shaban rejects this story altogether, but Blankinship regards it as reliable, although he too considers it a mere tactical ploy to gain time by Asim.

=== End of the rebellion, the Türgesh intervention and exile ===
Asad arrived in Khurasan with 20,000 Syrian troops, and immediately took the offensive against Harith. Asad's campaign was costly, but after his first successes the Khurasani Arabs began to flock to him. Asad's success was aided by his long-standing personal relations with the local Arab tribal leaders, as well as by the continuing tribal rivalries: as a Yamani opposed to the Mudari Harith, he could count on the support of his fellow tribesmen—thus most of the Rabi'ah, the traditional enemies of Harith's Tamim tribe, son defected to him. Asad divided his forces, sending the Kufan and Syrian troops under Abd al-Rahman ibn Na'yum towards Marw Rudh, where Harith's main army was located, while he himself with the Basrans and remaining Khurasanis marched on the fortresses of Amul and Zamm. The rebel forces at Amul surrendered and were pardoned, and the garrison of Balkh followed soon after. Harith himself abandoned Marw Rudh and retreated across the Oxus before Abd al-Rahman, finding refuge with the princes of Tokharistan. With their aid, he laid siege to the major crossing point over the Oxus at Tirmidh. In the face of Harith's forces, Asad's troops dared not cross the Oxus but retreated to Balkh. However, the Tirmidh garrison managed to defeat Harith, who was weakened after a quarrel with the king of Khuttal, and who now retired eastwards to the mountains of Badakhshan. Asad followed up this success by persuading the garrison of Zamm to surrender on promises of amnesty and double pay, and by an unsuccessful expedition to recover Samarqand, which had been lost in the aftermath of the Defile.

In the next year, 736, Asad's forces cleared the mountains of Upper Tokharistan from the remnants of Harith's supporters. The fortress of Tabushkhan, where many of Harith's followers and relatives had found refuge, was besieged by Juday al-Kirmani. After they surrendered, most of the men were executed, while the rest were sold into slavery. Harith himself on the other hand continued to escape capture. In 737, Asad led his troops again north of the Oxus in a retaliatory campaign against Khuttal, whose ruler had allied himself with both Harith and the Türgesh. While the Arab troops were dispersed ravaging the countryside, the Türgesh qaghan, Suluk, responding to the pleas for help by the Khuttalan king, launched an attack that precipitated a headlong flight back by Asad's army across the Oxus. The Türgesh followed after them and attacked and captured the Arab baggage train on 1 October, before both sides settled for winter quarters. Harith now emerged from hiding and joined the qaghan.

Harith now counselled the qaghan to take advantage of the dispersal of the Arab army to its winter quarters, and resume his advance. Following Harith's advice, in early December the qaghan led the Türgesh army, 30,000 strong and comprising contingents from virtually every native ruler of Transoxiana and Upper Tokharistan, south, bypassing Balkh, into Guzgan, hoping to raise the Hephthalite princes of Lower Tokharistan in revolt as well. In this he failed, as the king of Guzgan joined Asad, who was approaching with what forces he could muster. Asad's advance caught the qaghan and Harith off guard: Asad came upon them near Kharistan when they were accompanied by only 4,000 men, the rest having scattered to plunder and forage. In the ensuing Battle of Kharistan, Asad routed the Türgesh. Harith, who fought with distinction, and the qaghan barely escaped themselves and fled north over the Oxus. Asad's victory at Kharistan saved Arab rule in Central Asia. The Türgesh detachments south of the Oxus were largely destroyed piecemeal by Juday al-Kirmani, ending the threat to Khurasan, and the loyalty of the native rulers of Tokharistan was cemented. The qaghan's prestige took a serious hit, which encouraged his domestic rivals, who were backed secretly by the Chinese. In early 738, the tarkhan Kursul assassinated Suluk, whereupon the Türgesh realm collapsed in civil war. Asad too died soon after, and was succeeded by Nasr ibn Sayyar in July 738.

Nothing is known of Harith's activities during the next two years, but he evidently remained in northern Transoxiana, based at al-Shash (Tashkent) and in close contact with the Türgesh. In 740 or 741, after having consolidated his authority in Khurasan and carried out tax reforms that eased the social unrest, Nasr ibn Sayyar advanced into the middle Jaxartes valley, making for Shash. His campaign was part of Nasr's efforts to re-establish Arab control over Transoxiana, but, according to H.A.R. Gibb and Kister, the main objective was the expulsion of Harith from Shash, who might still unite the Türgesh and the native princes against the Arabs. In the event, Nasr was prevented from crossing the Jaxartes by an army composed of Türgesh, troops from Shash and Harith's followers, and was forced to withdraw after a negotiated settlement, which among other terms stipulated the removal of Harith and his adherents to the remote town of Farab.

=== Return to Khurasan, second rebellion and death ===
Nasr's campaigns and reforms consolidated Muslim rule over Khurasan and much of Transoxiana, but his success was fragile: the native princes resented their loss of autonomy and the increasing assimilation of their people by their Arab conquerors and sent embassies to the Chinese court for aid, while the rivalry between the Mudari and Yamani tribal groups, evident across the Muslim world, still divided the Arabs themselves. On the accession of the pro-Yemenite caliph Yazid III in 744, the Khurasani Yemenites supported Juday al-Kirmani's candidature as governor, and when this did not come about, they rebelled. Consequently, Nasr felt it necessary to bring Harith and his adherents back, to both strengthen his own position—Harith and his followers had a long history of enmity towards al-Kirmani—and remove a potential source for another foreign invasion. Nasr secured a full pardon for Harith and his supporters from Yazid. Their confiscated property was returned, and the Caliph even promised to rule "according to the Book and the Sunnah".

When Harith arrived at Marw in early July 745, however, the situation had changed: Yazid was dead, a full-blown civil war had erupted in Syria, and Nasr ibn Sayyar, although still occupying the position of governor, lacked authority. Although he recognized Marwan II (r. 744–750), most of his own followers did not accept Marwan as Caliph. Harith was quick to distance himself from Nasr: he refused the offer of a district governorship, and distributed the gifts he received among his supporters. Harith vocally denounced Marwan II, and was soon joined by 3,000 of his fellow Tamimis, while his secretary, Jahm ibn Safwan, drummed up further support. Within a short time, he had become a graver threat to Nasr than al-Kirmani. After attempts to negotiate an agreement proved fruitless, Nasr attacked Harith's forces in March 746, and scored a first victory over them, in which Jahm ibn Safwan fell. At this point, al-Kirmani joined forces with Harith, and together they forced Nasr to abandon Marw and withdraw to Naysabur. The two allies entered the capital of Khurasan, but within days fell out and began fighting each other. In these clashes, Harith was killed, leaving al-Kirmani the master of the city. The conflict between Nasr and al-Kirmani continued, but was soon overtaken by events: exploiting the conditions of civil war, the Abbasids under Abu Muslim launched their own anti-Umayyad revolt in Khurasan. Nasr ibn Sayyar tried to conclude an alliance with al-Kirmani, but failed when the latter was murdered by one of Harith's sons in revenge. Abu Muslim managed to exploit the situation to his advantage, and in early 748, his men entered Marw, the first step in a war that would lead to the fall of the Umayyad dynasty and its replacement with the Abbasids two years later.

== Sources ==
- Blankinship, Khalid Yahya (1994). The End of the Jihâd State: The Reign of Hishām ibn ʻAbd al-Malik and the Collapse of the Umayyads. Albany, New York: State University of New York Press. ISBN 978-0-7914-1827-7.
- Gibb, H. A. R. (1923). The Arab Conquests in Central Asia. London: The Royal Asiatic Society. OCLC 499987512.
- Hawting, Gerald R. (2000). The First Dynasty of Islam: The Umayyad Caliphate AD 661–750 (Second ed.). London and New York: Routledge. ISBN 0-415-24072-7.
- Kister, M. J. (1971). "Al-Ḥārith b. Suraydj". In Lewis, B.; Ménage, V. L.; Pellat, Ch. & Schacht, J. (eds.). The Encyclopaedia of Islam, Second Edition. Volume III: H–Iram. Leiden: E. J. Brill. pp. 223–224. OCLC 495469525.
- Shaban, M. A. (1979). The ʿAbbāsid Revolution. Cambridge: Cambridge University Press. ISBN 0-521-29534-3.
- Sharon, Moshe (1990). Black Banners from the East, Volume II. Revolt: The Social and Military Aspects of the ʿAbbāsid Revolution. Jerusalem: Graph Press Ltd. ISBN 965-223-388-9.
