= Asad ibn Abdallah al-Qasri =

Official of the Umayyad Caliphate (died 738)

- Died: February 738; Balkh
- Years active: 724–738
- Known for: Twice Umayyad governor of Khurasan, defeated the Türgesh
- Opponents: Suluk; al-Harith ibn Surayj
- Father: Abdallah ibn Yazid al-Qasri

Asad ibn Abdallah al-Qasri (Arabic: أسد بن عبد الله القسري; died 738) was a prominent official of the Umayyad Caliphate, serving twice as governor of Khurasan under the Caliph Hisham ibn Abd al-Malik. The descendant of a prominent Arab family, he was the brother of Khalid al-Qasri, the powerful governor of Iraq for most of Hisham's reign. Asad's first tenure as governor in 724–727 came in the wake of the "Day of Thirst", a severe defeat at the hands of the Türgesh Turks in Transoxiana. Asad tried to reconcile the local Soghdians to Muslim rule, initiated tax reforms to address the grievances of the native converts to Islam (mawali), and enjoyed good relations with many local nobles, who began to convert to Islam under his influence. His military expeditions during his first tenure were targeted mainly against restive local princes, avoiding a direct confrontation with the Türgesh Turks.

After his dismissal, his successors reversed his policy of reconciliation, resulting in a large-scale anti-Arab rebellion among the native Iranian Soghdians. Another major defeat against the Türgesh in the Battle of the Defile was followed by the almost complete collapse of the Arab position in Transoxiana and the outbreak of a major rebellion in Khurasan itself, led by al-Harith ibn Surayj. Appointed for a second time to govern Khurasan in late 734, Asad brought fresh troops into the province and managed to suppress Harith's uprising in 735–736, although the rebel leader himself escaped capture. An expedition in Khuttal in 737 brought about the intervention of the Türgesh ruler, the qaghan, at the head of an army. Despite initial Arab setbacks in the Battle of the Baggage and the Türgesh invasion of Khurasan, Asad succeeded in inflicting a defeat upon the qaghan in person at the Battle of Kharistan, turning back the Türgesh army. Despite Asad's death a few months later, this success was instrumental in preserving Muslim rule in Central Asia, as the blow to the qaghan's prestige led to his murder soon after and the collapse of Türgesh power. At the same time, Asad's conciliatory policy towards the native population laid the foundations for its eventual acceptance of Muslim rule and the Islamization of Central Asia.

== Origin ==
Asad was a member of the Qasr clan, a subtribe of the Bajila. His great-grandfather, Asad ibn Kurz al-Qasri, is said by some traditions to have been the chief of the Bajila in the times of the Islamic prophet Muhammad, and is counted as one of Muhammad's companions. Other traditions, hostile to the family, report that Asad was a Jew and a runaway slave. Asad's grandfather Yazid was an early and prominent supporter of the Umayyads in the First Fitna, while Asad's father Abdallah sided with Ibn al-Zubayr in the Second Fitna, but was eventually pardoned by the Caliph Abd al-Malik (r. 685–705).

== First governorship of Khurasan ==
Map of Khurasan and Transoxiana in the 8th century

In 724, immediately after Hisham ibn Abd al-Malik (r. 724–743) ascended the throne, Asad's brother Khalid al-Qasri was appointed to the important post of governor of Iraq, with responsibility over the entire Islamic East, which he held until 738. Khalid in turn named Asad as governor of Khurasan. The two brothers thus became, according to the historian Patricia Crone, "among the most prominent men of the Marwanid period" of the Umayyad Caliphate. Asad's arrival in Khurasan found the province in peril: his predecessor, Muslim ibn Sa'id al-Kilabi, had just attempted a campaign against Ferghana and suffered a major defeat, the so-called "Day of Thirst", at the hands of the Türgesh Turks and the Soghdian principalities of Transoxiana that had risen up against Muslim rule.

According to the historian H. A. R. Gibb, this Muslim defeat "marks a period in the history of the Arab conquests. It was practically the last aggressive expedition of the Arabs into Transoxiana for fifteen years, but of much greater importance was the blow which it struck at Arab prestige. The roles were reversed; from now onwards the Arabs found themselves on the defensive and were gradually ousted from almost every district across the Oxus." In this situation, Asad followed a policy of consolidation and limited military activity, focusing on enforcing Muslim control in the minor local potentates and avoiding a direct confrontation with the Muslims' main enemy, the Türgesh. Thus in 107 AH (725 or 726 AD) Asad campaigned against Namrun, King of al-Gharshistan (northeast of Herat), whom he forced to submit and convert to Islam, before going on to subdue the region of Ghur (central Afghanistan). The next year, Asad campaigned in Khuttal in Tokharistan, where he was confronted by the qaghan, the ruler of the Türgesh, who was called upon for aid by the local ruler, al-Sabal. One tradition holds that Asad retreated over the Oxus and went on to campaign with success in Ghur in the next year, but according to another he suffered a heavy defeat by the Türgesh. In either case, Asad's military ventures were only moderately successful, and most importantly failed to address the growing danger of the Türgesh, who with the support of the local princes threatened to expel the Arabs back beyond the Oxus.

At the same time, Asad tried to conciliate the local population, hoping to prevent them from supporting the Türgesh. He continued his predecessor's policy of appointing men known for their honesty as his fiscal agents. His reforms aimed to stop discrimination against the mawali, the native converts to Islam, by ceasing the collection of the jizya tax from them. This measure was vehemently opposed by the Arab settlers of Khurasan, but according to Khalid Yahya Blankinship "it may have helped to discourage the Turks for a couple of years by keeping the Transoxianans on the Muslims' side". Despite Asad's efforts and his good relations with the local Iranian land-owning class, the dihqans, taxation remained a heavy burden for the subject populations, and the greed and cruelty of Arab and Iranian tax collectors alike meant that Khurasan became a fertile field for the Shi'ite and Abbasid missionaries of the Hashimiyya. Among the local nobility, Saman Khuda, the ancestor of the Samanid dynasty, is said to have been converted to Islam by Asad at this time, and Saman's eldest son was named Asad in the governor's honour.

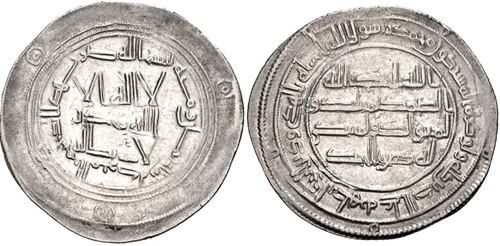
Silver dirham minted in Hisham ibn Abd al-Malik's name at the mint of Balkh, 108 AH (726 or 727 AD)

In 726 Asad rebuilt the city of Balkh, which had been destroyed by Qutayba ibn Muslim following a revolt, and transferred there the Arab garrison troops from nearby Barukhan. Asad also resumed, after almost a decade, the practice of sending envoys to the Chinese court. This move was clearly linked to the Türgesh threat, as the Turks were Chinese vassals and were regarded by the Transoxianians as the agents of the Chinese emperor, sent to deliver them from Arab rule. Asad is also said to have built the village of Asadabad near Nishapur, which his descendants held until Tahirid times.

Asad was dismissed from his office in Ramadan 109 AH (December 727 or January 728 AD), when in an outburst of anger he had the chief representatives of the four greatest Arab tribes in Khurasan, the Ahl al-Aliyah, Azd, Tamim, and Bakr, publicly flogged. Caliph Hisham demanded his dismissal, and after naming al-Hakam ibn Awana al-Kalbi as his deputy, Asad returned to his brother in Iraq.

== Second governorship of Khurasan ==
Asad was replaced by Ashras ibn Abdallah al-Sulami (727–730). The new governor at first continued Asad's policy of conciliation, but then reversed it, leading to the outbreak of a full-scale rebellion in Transoxiana, which, coupled with renewed Türgesh attacks, reduced the Arab presence there to Samarkand and its environs. Ashras was able to recover Bukhara, but his successor, Junayd ibn Abd al-Rahman al-Murri, presided over the disaster of the Battle of the Defile, which crippled the Khurasani army, in 731. By the time of Junayd's death in 734, the Muslim holdings in Transoxiana had been reduced to Bukhara and parts of Tokharistan. These military defeats, the long-held grievances against the Umayyad government, and the forcible requisition of food by Junayd during the famine of 733 led to the outbreak of a rebellion in early 734, led by al-Harith ibn Surayj. Harith's uprising involved both Arabs and native princes, especially from the hitherto loyal principalities of Tokharistan, and spread quickly, with the rebels capturing Balkh. The new governor, Asim ibn Abdallah al-Hilali, managed to check Harith's advance on the capital, Marw, and forced him to seek terms. Asim's position remained precarious, however, and he wrote to the Caliph, asking for the placement of Khurasan once again under the purview of Iraq, the appointment of a new governor and the substantial reinforcement of the province with Syrian troops. Hisham accepted the recommendations, and instructed Khalid al-Qasri to send Asad once again as governor to Khurasan. Early in 735, Harith renewed his rebellion. This time, whether due to pressure from local sympathizers in Marw or as an expedient way to gain time for Asad to arrive, Asim agreed to a truce with Harith, promising also to support Harith's demands against the Caliph.

In early 735 Asad arrived once more to take up the governorship of Khurasan, this time accompanied by 20,000 Syrian troops, according to the 11th-century historian Gardizi. He imprisoned Asim for embezzling money and failing to campaign against the rebels, and immediately took the field himself. He soon gained the upper hand in a succession of victorious, if costly, battles with Harith's supporters. Asad's success was aided by his long-standing personal relations with the local Arab tribal leaders, as well as by the continuing tribal rivalries: as a Yamani fighting against the Mudari Harith, he could count on the support of his fellow tribesmen; thus most of the Rabi'ah, the traditional enemies of Harith's Tamim tribe, soon defected to him. Asad divided his forces, sending the Kufan and Syrian troops under Abd al-Rahman ibn Na'yum towards Marw Rudh, where Harith's main army was located, while he himself with the Basrans and remaining Khurasanis marched on the fortresses of Amul and Zamm. The rebel forces at Amul surrendered and were pardoned, and the garrison of Balkh followed soon after. Harith abandoned Marw Rudh and retreated across the Oxus before Abd al-Rahman, finding refuge with the princes of Tokharistan. With their aid, he laid siege to the major crossing point over the Oxus at Tirmidh. In the face of Harith's forces, Asad's troops could not cross the Oxus, but retreated to Balkh. The Tirmidh garrison, however, managed to defeat Harith, who retired eastwards to the mountains of Badakhshan. Asad followed up this success by persuading the garrison of Zamm to surrender on promises of amnesty and double pay. Asad then led an expedition to recover Samarkand, which had been lost in the aftermath of the Defile. He failed to take the city, and returned to Balkh after destroying the sluices of the city's irrigation canals.

The next year, 736, Asad's forces cleared the mountains of Upper Tokharistan from the remnants of Harith's supporters. Many of the latter, including some of Harith's relatives, were blockaded in the fortress of Tabushkhan by Asad's commander Juday al-Kirmani with 6,000 men, until they surrendered. According to al-Tabari, 400 of the men were executed, and the other defenders, including women and children, were sold into slavery. The same year, Asad moved the capital of Khurasan to Balkh. This decision was influenced by several factors: Balkh was the traditional, pre-Islamic capital of Khurasan, and remained so in the eyes of the local population; it lay closer to Tokharistan, where Asad concentrated his military activities; and it was settled by reliable Syrians, removed from the factional politics of the Khurasani Arabs of Marw. At this time, Asad also captured and executed one of the leaders of the Khurasani Hashimiyya movement, Ammar ibn Yazid, known as Khidash, by crucifixion.

In 737, Asad again led his troops north of the Oxus in a retaliatory campaign against Khuttal, whose ruler had allied himself with both Harith and the Türgesh. While Asad captured a few fortresses and pillaged the land, the Khuttalan regent, Ibn al-Sa'iji, called for aid from the Türgesh qaghan, Suluk. The Türgesh army's arrival caught the Arab troops, widely dispersed while ravaging the countryside, by surprise, and precipitated a headlong flight across the Oxus. The Türgesh followed after them. In the Battle of the Baggage, they attacked and almost annihilated the Arab baggage train, which Asad had sent ahead. The timely arrival of Asad's main army saved the baggage train's remnants, before both sides settled for winter quarters. Ominously for the Arabs, the qaghan remained in Khurasan instead of retiring north, and Harith now emerged from hiding and joined him. Harith now counselled the qaghan to take advantage of the dispersal of the Arab army to its winter quarters, and to resume his advance. In early December the qaghan led the Türgesh army, 30,000 strong with contingents from virtually every native ruler of Transoxiana and Upper Tokharistan, south. They bypassed Balkh and marched into Juzjan, hoping to raise the Hephthalite princes of Lower Tokharistan in revolt as well. In this the Türgesh failed, as the king of Juzjan joined Asad, who was approaching with what forces he could muster. Asad's advance caught the qaghan and Harith off guard; Asad came upon them near Kharistan, where they were accompanied by only 4,000 men, the rest having scattered to plunder and forage. In the ensuing Battle of Kharistan, Asad routed the Türgesh. Harith and the qaghan barely escaped and fled north over the Oxus. The Türgesh detachments south of the Oxus were largely destroyed piecemeal by Juday al-Kirmani, ending the threat to Khurasan.

After his victory over the Türgesh, Asad sent an expedition against Badr Tarkhan, possibly a prince of Bamiyan in Ghur, who had taken advantage of the turmoil of the previous year and captured Khuttal. The expedition was successful, and Khuttal returned to Arab rule. A short while later, in February 738, Asad died at Balkh after a brief illness. Ja'far ibn Hanzala al-Bahrani succeeded him temporarily until, in July, Nasr ibn Sayyar was named to the governorship.

== Legacy ==
Asad's second governorship was of crucial importance to the future of Central Asia. His victory at Kharistan averted a possible collapse of Muslim rule and ended the Türgesh threat to Khurasan and Transoxiana. As Gibb writes, it was not only "the turning-point in the fortunes of the Arabs in Central Asia, but gave the signal for the downfall of Türgesh power". The qaghan′s defeat was a serious blow to his prestige, encouraging his domestic rivals, who assassinated him in early 738, backed secretly by the Chinese. The Türgesh realm collapsed in civil war, leaving the Muslims without a serious opponent in the region. At the same time, Asad's excellent personal relationship with the native nobility strengthened their ties to the Arab government. As Gibb writes, "he was able to attract to his side many of the more influential elements in Lower Tokharistan and the Hephthalite lands—to this, in fact, was largely due his success in the struggle with the Turks." His influence led to the conversion to Islam of several local rulers, like Saman Khuda and possibly also the Barmak. Even though as yet "practically confined to the ruling classes" and limited to the territories under direct Arab control, Gibb credits Asad with beginning a process of "true reconciliation". For this achievement he was greatly honoured by later generations, as attested in the work of the 10th-century Bukharan historian Narshakhi. His successor, Nasr ibn Sayyar, was able to build upon Asad's work and restore the Arab position over much of Transoxiana; Muslim pre-eminence over western Central Asia was sealed with the Battle of Talas in 751, and the withdrawal of Chinese influence after the outbreak of the An Lushan Rebellion.

== Sources ==
- Blankinship, Khalid Yahya, ed. (1989). The History of al-Ṭabarī, Volume XXV: The End of Expansion: The Caliphate of Hishām, A.D. 724–738/A.H. 105–120. SUNY Series in Near Eastern Studies. Albany, New York: State University of New York Press. ISBN 978-0-88706-569-9.
- Blankinship, Khalid Yahya (1994). The End of the Jihâd State: The Reign of Hishām ibn ʻAbd al-Malik and the Collapse of the Umayyads. Albany, New York: State University of New York Press. ISBN 978-0-7914-1827-7.
- Crone, Patricia (1980). Slaves on Horses: The Evolution of the Islamic Polity (1980 ed.). Cambridge: Cambridge University Press. ISBN 978-0521229616.
- Frye, R. N. (1975). "The Sāmānids". In Frye, Richard N. (ed.). The Cambridge History of Iran: From the Arab Invasion to the Saljuqs. Vol. 4. Cambridge: Cambridge University Press. pp. 136–161. ISBN 0-521-20093-8.
- Gibb, H. A. R. (1923). The Arab Conquests in Central Asia. London: The Royal Asiatic Society.
- Gibb, H. A. R. (1960). "Asad b. ʿAbd Allāh". In Gibb, H. A. R.; Kramers, J. H.; Lévi-Provençal, E.; Schacht, J.; Lewis, B. & Pellat, Ch. (eds.). The Encyclopaedia of Islam, Second Edition. Volume I: A–B. Leiden: E. J. Brill. pp. 684–685. OCLC 495469456.
- Hawting, G. R. (1971). "K̲h̲ālid b. ʿAbd Allāh al-Ḳasrī". In Lewis, B.; Ménage, V. L.; Pellat, Ch. & Schacht, J. (eds.). The Encyclopaedia of Islam, Second Edition. Volume III: H–Iram. Leiden: E. J. Brill. pp. 925–927. OCLC 495469525.
- Shaban, M. A. (1979). The ʿAbbāsid Revolution. Cambridge: Cambridge University Press. ISBN 0-521-29534-3.

Preceded by Muslim ibn Sa'id al-Kilabi	Umayyad governor of Khurasan; 724–727	Succeeded by Ashras ibn Abdallah al-Sulami
Preceded by Asim ibn Abdallah al-Hilali	Umayyad governor of Khurasan; 734–738	Succeeded by Nasr ibn Sayyar
