= Nasr ibn Sayyar =

Umayyad governor of Khurasan from 738 to 748

- Died: 9 December 748 (aged 84–85); Sawa, Iran
- Children: Al-Layth, Tamim
- Relatives: Rafi ibn al-Layth (grandson)
- Military career
- Allegiance: Umayyad Caliphate
- Service years: c. 705–748
- Rank: Governor of Khurasan
- Conflicts: Umayyad-Turgesh Wars, Muslim conquest of Transoxiana, Arab tribal wars in Khurasan, Abbasid Revolution

Naṣr ibn Sayyār al-Lāythi al-Kināni (Arabic: نصر بن سيار الليثي الكناني; 663 – 9 December 748) was an Arab general and the last Umayyad governor of Khurasan in 738–748. Nasr played a distinguished role in the wars against the Turgesh, although he failed to decisively confront the rebellion of al-Harith ibn Surayj in its early stages. Although respected as a soldier and a statesman, he owed his appointment as governor more to his obscure tribal background, which rendered him dependent on the caliph. His tenure was nevertheless successful, as Nasr introduced long-overdue tax reforms that alleviated social tension and largely restored and stabilized Umayyad control in Transoxiana, which had been greatly reduced under the Turgesh onslaught. His last years were occupied by inter-tribal rivalries and uprisings, however, as the Umayyad Caliphate itself descended into a period of civil war. In 746 Nasr was driven from his capital by Ibn Surayj and Juday al-Kirmani, but returned after the latter fell out among themselves, resulting in Ibn Surayj's death. Preoccupied with this conflict, Nasr was unable to stop the outbreak and spread of the Abbasid Revolution, whose leader, Abu Muslim, exploited the situation to his advantage. Evicted from his province in early 748, he fled to Persia pursued by the Abbasid forces, where he died on 9 December 748.

== Early life and career ==
The Umayyad Caliphate at its greatest extent c. 740, before the Third Fitna

Nasr was a military leader with long service and experience in Khurasan. As early as 705 he participated in a campaign along the upper Oxus River, led by Salih, the brother of Qutayba ibn Muslim, the general who had been tasked with subduing Transoxiana. For his service during this campaign, Nasr was awarded an entire village in this region. Despite the successes of Qutayba, much of Central Asia east of the Oxus remained outside effective Arab control; while garrisons had been established in places like Samarkand, Balkh, or Bukhara, the Umayyad Caliphate largely relied on cliental relationships with the multitude of local rulers, who became tributary to the Umayyads. In addition, clashes with the Chinese-backed Türgesh, the ambiguous policy followed regarding conversion of the native population (mass conversions would lessen the taxable population and hence the amount of tribute received) and increasing inter-Arab tribal factionalism weakened Umayyad control over the region and necessitated increased military activity.

In 724, Nasr is recorded as heading a Mudari army sent against Balkh, where restive Yamani troops refused to participate in the expedition against Ferghana that resulted in the disastrous 'Day of Thirst'. His troops, reinforced by men from the subject Hephthalite principality of Chaghaniyan, clashed with the Yaman at Baruqan and prevailed over them. This led to resentment towards his person among the Yaman, especially from those around Balkh; and during the governorship of the Yamani Asad ibn Abdallah al-Qasri, along with other Mudari leaders, Nasr fell into disfavour and was mistreated.

Nasr was one of the few Muslim leaders to distinguish himself in the disastrous Battle of the Defile in July 731. In 734 he was appointed as governor of Balkh, after arresting the previous governor. There he faced the rebellion of the local Khurasani troops under al-Harith ibn Surayj, who called for reforms in taxation and the ending of discrimination towards the native converts (mawali). Ibn Surayj marched on Balkh and took the city with only 4,000 followers, even though Nasr commanded 10,000 men. It is unclear from the sources whether the town was seized from Nasr, or whether it was captured in his absence and then successfully held against him. In any case, Nasr and his army remained passive for the remainder of the revolt; they did not aid the provincial capital, Merv, when the rebels attacked it, and this stance encouraged several local tribes to join the uprising. Eventually however the rebels were defeated by Juday al-Kirmani, with Ibn Surayj fleeing across the Oxus to the Türgesh.

== Appointment as governor of Khurasan ==
Map of Khurasan and Transoxiana in the 8th century

In July 738, at the age of 74, Nasr was appointed as governor of Khurasan. Despite his age, he was widely respected both for his military record, his knowledge of the affairs of Khurasan and his abilities as a statesman. Julius Wellhausen wrote of him that "His age did not affect the freshness of his mind, as is testified not only by his deeds, but also by the verses in which he gave expression to his feelings till the very end of his life". However, in the climate of the times, his nomination owed more to his appropriate tribal affiliation than his personal qualities.

From the early days of the Muslim conquests, Arab armies were divided into regiments drawn from individual tribes or tribal confederations (butun or ʿashaʿir). Despite the fact that many of these groupings were recent creations, created for reasons of military efficiency rather than any common ancestry, they soon developed a strong and distinct identity. Eventually, and certainly by the beginning of the Umayyad period, this system progressed to the formation of ever-larger super-groupings, culminating in the two super-groups: the northern Arab Mudar or Qays, and the southern Arabs or Yaman, dominated by the Azd and Rabi'ah tribes. By the 8th century, this division had become firmly established across the Caliphate and was a source of constant internal instability, as the two groups formed in essence two rival political parties, jockeying for power and separated by a fierce hatred for each other. During the reign of Caliph Hisham ibn Abd al-Malik (r. 724–743), the Umayyad government appointed Mudari governors in Khurasan, except for Asad ibn Abdallah al-Qasri's tenure in 735–738. Nasr's appointment came four months after Asad's death. In the interim, the sources report variously that the province was run either by the Syrian general Ja'far ibn Hanzala al-Bahrani or by Asad's lieutenant Juday al-Kirmani. At any rate, the sources agree that al-Kirmani stood at the time as the most prominent man in Khurasan and should have been the clear choice for governor. His Yamani roots (he was the leader of the Azd in Khurasan), however, made him unpalatable to the caliph.

Nasr on the other hand, in addition to his other qualities, was a Mudari and married to a Tamimi wife. He would therefore be acceptable to the numerous Mudari element of the Khurasani army, which outnumbered the Yaman, but could also, as a local, help to reduce the Khurasani Arabs' discontent towards the Syria-centric Umayyad government. Nasr's own relatively obscure tribal background—from a non-noble family of the Layth tribe from Kinana—also suited the caliph's purposes, as it meant that he lacked any local power base of his own. His position was thus heavily reliant on the Umayyad central government in Damascus, no doubt as Hisham intended: the caliph is reported to have remarked that he himself would be Nasr's tribal group. As a result, Nasr's rule throughout his tenure was not fully accepted by many Arab tribesmen: aside from the Yaman, who favoured their own candidate al-Kirmani and resented the shift in power back towards the Mudar, the Qays around Nishapur refused to support him, and even the Syrian contingent sided with his opponents. Nasr was hence mostly reliant on the support of his wife's powerful Tamim tribe, living around Merv. As long as he was supported by a strong central government, Nasr was able to keep his internal enemies in check, but in the troubles that followed Hisham's death in 743, that support vanished. In the event, Nasr would succeed in retaining his office for a decade, despite the turmoil that swept the Caliphate after 743. When Yazid III came to power in early 744, he initially ordered Nasr replaced. Nasr refused to accept this, and held on to the post, being eventually confirmed to it a few months later. After Marwan II's rise to power in December 744, he likewise affirmed Nasr's position.

== Reforms and campaigns ==
Nasr gave his province an unprecedented period of good government, stability and prosperity, so that, in the words of the 9th-century historian al-Mada'ini, "Khurasan was built up as it had never been before". His major achievements during his tenure were the reform of the tax system and the restoration of Umayyad control over Transoxiana.

The Khurasani tax system had been established at the time of the Muslim conquest and remained unchanged since. It relied on the collection of a fixed tribute by the local non-Muslim (mostly Zoroastrian) gentry, the dihqans, who often discriminated against the Muslim settlers and the native converts. This contributed to the latter's increasing resentment of Umayyad rule, and the demand for a tax reform had fuelled past revolts like that of Ibn Surayj. Consequently, Nasr streamlined the tax system in 739, implementing a blanket imposition (the kharaj) on all owners of agricultural land and forcing the non-Muslims to pay an additional poll tax (the jizyah). In this way, the chroniclers report, 30,000 Muslims were absolved of the jizyah, and 80,000 non-Muslims were forced to pay it instead. Attention was also paid to the accurate collection of the kharaj in accordance with treaties with the local rulers, as a result of which the tax burden was generally eased. This reform is traditionally held to have assisted in regaining the loyalty of the local populations and their princes, who returned quickly to the Arab fold. Other modern scholars however consider the effect of this belated reform on the prevailing anti-Umayyad climate as minimal. Upon his appointment, Nasr also moved the provincial capital back to Merv from Balkh, where Asad had established it. Additionally, for the first time in the province's history he appointed sub-governors. They were drawn from among his allies and supporters in order to reward them and to improve his own control of the province.

Taking advantage of the disintegration of the Türgesh khaganate after the murder of the khagan Suluk, Nasr moved aggressively across the Oxus. His first campaign, immediately after his appointment, was in the area of Chaghaniyan; his second campaign, in 740, recovered much territory in Sogdia, including Samarkand, with little apparent resistance. Aiming to recover all the lands previously held under Qutayba ibn Muslim and to curtail the activities of the renegade Ibn Surayj, who was based there, Nasr then launched an expedition targeting al-Shash (Tashkent). The principality of Usrushana submitted peacefully, but when the Muslim army reached the Jaxartes, it was confronted by a 15,000-strong force from Shash along with Ibn Surayj's men and some Türgesh; according to Arab tradition, the latter were led by Suluk's murderer and successor, Kursul. According to the Arab sources, Nasr was able to drive off the Türgesh and scored a victory against one of their detachments, killing its chief. He apparently failed to subdue al-Shash, for he was forced to content himself with an agreement with the ruler of Shash, whereby Ibn Surayj was evicted to Farab, where the latter was left unmolested to continue his opposition to the Umayyads. Nasr also launched two expeditions against Ferghana, which plundered and ravaged the countryside and took many captives. It seems, however, that the Muslim reconquest at this time did not extend much further than Samarkand, with occasional tribute being possibly levied from the remoter principalities.

Outwardly at least, by 743 the Umayyad position in Khurasan appeared stronger than ever. The reality beneath the splendid façade however was different. Tension and mutual mistrust existed between the Khurasani Arab levies (muqatila) and the 20,000 Syrian troops introduced into the province as a security measure after the disastrous Battle of the Defile in 731, while tribal antagonisms continued to create trouble: apart from continued Yamani resentment at Nasr, there was strong dislike of the Umayyads' Syrian regime, fanned by their unjust tax policies. Although Nasr tried to remedy the situation, it was too late.

In addition, Khurasan was a major center of early Shiism, and specifically of the Kaysanite sect of the Hashimiyya, which had gained wide acceptance in the province, especially among the mawali. In 742–743, Nasr confronted and defeated a revolt led by Yahya, son of Zayd ibn Ali and the leader of the Hashimiyya in Khurasan. Yahya was captured and executed, and the resulting vacuum in the Hashimiyya leadership opened the path for the Khurasani branch of the movement to come under the control of the Abbasid family. It is however, a testament to the "respect and even affection" (Gibb) with which Nasr was regarded by the native population in Transoxiana, that in contrast to Khurasan, no native city there welcomed the Hashimiyya missionaries, and that they remained loyal to him even during the later Abbasid Revolution.

== Civil wars and the Abbasid Revolution ==
In 743, after the death of Caliph Hisham, his successor, Walid II, reconfirmed Nasr in his post. The influential governor of Iraq, Yusuf ibn Umar al-Thaqafi, an opponent of Nasr, tried to lure him away from his province by calling him to Iraq. Nasr delayed his departure, stalling for time, and was saved by the murder of Walid in April 744. Walid's successor, Yazid III, moved to install a regime dominated by the Yamani Kalb tribe. Nasr's position was severely undermined, and the Yamani faction now hoped to see their leader, Juday al-Kirmani, appointed governor in his stead. Indeed, Yazid appointed his favourite, the Kalbi Mansur ibn Jumhur, as governor of Iraq, and he in turn nominated his own brother as Nasr's replacement. Nasr refused to accept this, and was again fortunate in his persistence, for Mansur fell out of favour and was dismissed after only two months. Nasr's position was that regardless of the strife in the core territories of the caliphate, the Arabs of Khurasan, living on an exposed and dangerous frontier of the entire Islamic world, could not afford to be driven into civil strife; the historian al-Mada'ini reports his exhortation to the Khurasanis with the words: "O people of Khurasan, are an armed post at the throat of the enemy. Beware! Beware lest two of your swords cross each other!"

Despite Nasr's entreaties, agitation among the Yamani faction persisted, amidst rumours that Nasr had intercepted letters appointing al-Kirmani as governor, and a dispute on the payment of stipends to the muqatila. Nasr tried to secure his own position by deposing al-Kirmani from his leadership of the Azd, as well as by trying to win over Azd and Rabi'ah leaders. This led to a general uprising by the Azd and Rabi'ah under al-Kirmani. It is indicative of the lingering inter-tribal antagonism of the late Umayyad world that the rebellion was launched in the name of revenge for the Muhallabids, an Azd family that had been purged after rebelling in 720—an act which had since become a symbol of Yamani resentment of the Umayyads and their northern Arab-dominated regime.

On 13 July 744, Nasr captured and imprisoned al-Kirmani. After barely a month, the latter escaped, and his rebellion was joined not only by Azd soldiers, but also by many of the Arab settlers around Merv. A tentative truce was initially agreed upon, during which fruitless negotiations were conducted, but after Yazid reconfirmed Nasr in his post, al-Kirmani and the Yaman—in reality, al-Kirmani's followers included other tribes as well, including most of the Syrians and even some Mudar, but they were collectively called Yamaniyya in the sources—resumed their revolt. Nasr in turn tried to strengthen his own position by enlisting the services of al-Harith ibn Surayj, al-Kirmani's one-time adversary, who enjoyed considerable support among some Arab tribes and especially his fellow Tamimis. When Ibn Surayj arrived at Merv in July 745 he was enthusiastically received by the town's inhabitants. Scorning Nasr's proposals for cooperation, Ibn Surayj soon withdrew to the countryside and rose in rebellion as well. Ibn Surayj was also able to exploit the unpopularity of Marwan II among the Mudar and Nasr's followers, even though Nasr recognized him as the legitimate caliph in exchange for his own confirmation to his post. Exploiting this resentment, Ibn Surayj soon gathered around him an army of over 3,000 men.

In March 746 Ibn Surayj's army attacked Merv, but was repulsed with many casualties, and he then made common cause with al-Kirmani—of whose activities between his escape in 744 and this point nothing is known. With Marwan II still trying to consolidate his own position in Syria and Mesopotamia, Nasr was bereft of any hopes of reinforcement, and the allied armies of Ibn Surayj and al-Kirmani drove him out of Merv towards the end of 746. Nasr retreated to Nishapur, but within days al-Kirmani and Ibn Surayj fell out among themselves and clashed, resulting in the death of Ibn Surayj. Al-Kirmani then destroyed the Tamimi quarters in the city, a shocking act, as dwellings were traditionally considered exempt from warfare in Arab culture. As a result, the Mudari tribes, hitherto reserved towards Nasr, now came over to him. Backed by them, especially the Qays settled around Nishapur, Nasr now resolved to take back the capital. During summer 747, Nasr's and al-Kirmani's armies confronted each other before the walls of Merv, occupying two fortified camps and skirmishing with each other for several months. The fighting stopped only when news came of the start of the Hashimiyya uprising under Abu Muslim.

Negotiations commenced, but were almost broken off when a member of Nasr's entourage, an embittered son of Ibn Surayj, attacked and killed al-Kirmani. Calmer heads prevailed for the moment, the two sides were able to tentatively settle their differences, and Nasr re-occupied his seat in Merv. Tensions however remained, and Abu Muslim soon managed to persuade al-Kirmani's son and successor, Ali, that Nasr had been involved in his father's murder. As a result, both Ali al-Kirmani and Nasr separately appealed for aid against each other to Abu Muslim, who now held the balance of power. The latter eventually chose to support al-Kirmani. On 14 February 748, the Hashimiyya army occupied Merv, and Nasr again had to flee the city. Pursued by the Hashimiyya forces under Qahtaba ibn Shabib al-Ta'i, Nasr was forced to abandon Nishapur too after his son Tamim was defeated at Tus, and retreat to the region of Qumis, on the western borderlands of Khurasan. At this point, the long-awaited reinforcements from the caliph arrived, but their general and Nasr failed to coordinate their movements, and Qahtaba was able to defeat the caliph's army at Rayy and kill its commander. Nasr was now forced to abandon Qumis and flee towards Hamadan. On the way, in the town of Sawa, he fell ill and died on 9 December, at the age of 85.

Nasr's grandson, Rafi ibn al-Layth, led a large-scale rebellion against the misgovernment of the Abbasid governor, Ali ibn Isa ibn Mahan, in 807–810, which spread across Khurasan and Transoxiana.

== Sources ==
- Blankinship, Khalid Yahya, ed. (1989). The History of al-Ṭabarī, Volume XXV: The End of Expansion: The Caliphate of Hishām, A.D. 724–738/A.H. 105–120. SUNY Series in Near Eastern Studies. Albany, New York: State University of New York Press. ISBN 978-0-88706-569-9.
- Blankinship, Khalid Yahya (1994). The End of the Jihâd State: The Reign of Hishām ibn ʻAbd al-Malik and the Collapse of the Umayyads. Albany, New York: State University of New York Press. ISBN 978-0-7914-1827-7.
- Bosworth, C. E. (1993). "Naṣr b. Sayyār". In Bosworth, C. E.; van Donzel, E.; Heinrichs, W. P. & Pellat, Ch. (eds.). The Encyclopaedia of Islam, Second Edition. Volume VII: Mif–Naz. Leiden: E. J. Brill. pp. 1015–1016. doi:10.1163/1573-3912_islam_SIM_5838. ISBN 978-90-04-09419-2.
- Daniel, Elton L. (1979). The Political and Social History of Khurasan under Abbasid Rule, 747–820. Minneapolis and Chicago: Bibliotheca Islamica, Inc. ISBN 0-88297-025-9.
- Gibb, H. A. R. (1923). The Arab Conquests in Central Asia. London: The Royal Asiatic Society.
- Hawting, Gerald R. (2000). The First Dynasty of Islam: The Umayyad Caliphate AD 661–750 (Second ed.). London and New York: Routledge. ISBN 0-415-24072-7.
- Mottahedeh, Roy (1975). "The ʿAbbāsid Caliphate in Iran". In Frye, Richard N. (ed.). The Cambridge History of Iran: From the Arab Invasion to the Saljuqs. Vol. 4. Cambridge: Cambridge University Press. pp. 57–89. ISBN 0-521-20093-8.
- Shaban, M. A. (1979). The ʿAbbāsid Revolution. Cambridge: Cambridge University Press. ISBN 0-521-29534-3.
- Sharon, Moshe (1990). Revolt: The Social and Military Aspects of the ʿAbbāsid revolution. Jerusalem: Graph Press Ltd. ISBN 965-223-388-9.
- Zarrinkub, Abd al-Husain (1975). "The Arab conquest of Iran and its aftermath". In Frye, Richard N. (ed.). The Cambridge History of Iran: From the Arab Invasion to the Saljuqs. Vol. 4. Cambridge: Cambridge University Press. pp. 1–56. ISBN 0-521-20093-8.

Preceded by Asad ibn Abdallah al-Qasri	Umayyad governor of Khurasan; 738–748	Succeeded by Abu Muslim as leader of the Abbasid Revolution
