= Day of Thirst =

Battle fought in 724 between Caliphate and Turgesh tribal confederation

- Part of the Muslim conquest of Transoxiana
- Map of Transoxiana in the 8th century
Date	724 AD
Location	near Khujand (modern Tajikistan)
Result	Türgesh victory

Belligerents
Umayyad Caliphate	Türgesh Khaganate and Transoxianian allies

Commanders and leaders
Muslim ibn Sa'id al-Kilabi	Suluk

Casualties and losses
Heavy	Unknown

The "Day of Thirst" (Arabic: ﻳﻮﻢ ﺍلعطش, romanized: Yawm al-aṭash) is the name traditionally given in Arabic historiography to a battle fought in 724 between the Turkic Türgesh Khaganate and the Umayyad Caliphate on the banks of the Syr Darya river, in Transoxiana (in modern Tajikistan, Central Asia). The Umayyad army, under Muslim ibn Sa'id al-Kilabi, was campaigning in the Ferghana Valley when it learned of the Türgesh advance. Immediately, the Arabs began a hasty retreat to the Syr Darya, pursued and harassed by the Türgesh cavalry. Finally, after 11 days, the Umayyad army reached the river, where it was caught between the Türgesh and the forces of the native Transoxianian principalities. Nevertheless, the Arabs managed to break through and cross the river to Khujand. The Umayyad defeat led to the collapse of Muslim rule over much of the region, which until c. 740 remained disputed territory, with both the Arabs and the Türgesh fighting for control over it.

== Background ==
The region of Transoxiana had been conquered by the Muslim Arabs of the Umayyad Caliphate under Qutayba ibn Muslim in the reign of al-Walid I (r. 705–715), following the Muslim conquests of Persia and Khurasan in the mid-7th century. The loyalties of Transoxiana's native Iranian and Turkic populations and those of autonomous local rulers remained questionable, however, as demonstrated in 719, when the Transoxianian princes sent a petition to the Chinese and their Türgesh vassals for military aid against the Caliphate's governors. The Türgesh responded by launching a series of attacks against the Muslims in Transoxiana, beginning in 720. These incursions were coupled with uprisings against the Caliphate among the local Sogdians. The Umayyad governor of Khurasan, Sa'id ibn Amr al-Harashi, harshly suppressed the unrest and restored the Muslim position almost to what it had been during the time of Qutayba, except for the Ferghana Valley, control over which was lost.

== Expedition against Ferghana and the "Day of Thirst" ==
In 723, al-Harashi was replaced as governor by Muslim ibn Sa'id al-Kilabi, who resolved late the next year to launch an expedition with the goal of seizing Ferghana. The campaign faced difficulties already in its early stages, when the news arrived of the accession of a new caliph, Hisham ibn Abd al-Malik, and the appointment of a new governor of Iraq, Khalid al-Qasri. This brought the long-simmering tribal rivalries of the Arabs of Khurasan to the fore: the Yemeni (southern Arab) troops in Balkh initially refused to join the campaign, as they expected the imminent recall of al-Kilabi (who was of northern Arab stock) by the new regime. Only after Nasr ibn Sayyar led a force of Mudaris (northern Arabs) against them and defeated them at Baruqan did the Yemenis join al-Kilabi's army. The campaign eventually went ahead as Khalid al-Qasri wrote to al-Kilabi, urging him to proceed with it until his replacement, Khalid's brother Asad, arrived in Khurasan. Nevertheless, 4,000 troops from the Yemeni Azd tribe withdrew from the army.

Al-Kilabi led his army along the Jaxartes valley to Ferghana, and laid siege to it while devastating the surrounding countryside. At this point, the Umayyad army became aware that the Türgesh khagan Suluk was advancing against them with an army stronger than their own. Abandoning the siege, the Muslim army retreated so hastily towards the south that it was claimed they covered a distance in one day that equalled three days of normal travel. On the second day, after the Arabs crossed the river Wadi al-Subuh, the Türgesh army caught up with them, and attacked a secondary camp pitched by Abdallah ibn Abi Abdallah separately from the main Arab force. The Arabs and their Sogdian allies suffered heavy casualties—the brother of the ruler of Samarkand, Ghurak, being among the slain—but managed to repel the attack.

The Arabs continued their retreat for eight more days, during which they were constantly harassed by the Türgesh cavalry. On the ninth day, the Arabs reached the Jaxartes only to find their path blocked by their enemies, troops of the native principalities of Shash and Farghana, and the remnants of the Sogdian rebellion that Sa'id al-Harashi had suppressed. The Arabs made camp for the night and burned all their baggage, allegedly worth one million dirhams, in preparation for battle. On the next day, despite suffering from thirst and being hemmed in between the Türgesh on their rear and the Transoxianian forces in front, the desperate Arabs managed to break through the enemy lines and cross the Jaxartes. As al-Tabari writes, when they reached the relative safety of Khujand, "suffering from hunger and exhaustion, the troops spread out in disorder". There, the leadership of the army was formally transferred to Abd al-Rahman ibn Na'im al-Ghamidi, who led the remnants of the army back to Samarkand.

== Aftermath and impact ==
The defeat of the Arab army, and the casualties suffered, was a catalyst for the almost complete collapse of Muslim rule in Transoxiana over the next few years. In the words of the British scholar H. A. R. Gibb, "it was practically the last aggressive expedition of the Arabs into Transoxania for fifteen years, but of much greater importance was the blow which it struck at Arab prestige. The roles were reversed; from now onwards the Arabs found themselves on the defensive and were gradually ousted from almost every district across the Oxus." The new Umayyad governor, Asad al-Qasri, campaigned incessantly over the next few years, but without achieving any major result. Asad also tried to secure the cooperation of the local elites by abolishing for a time the payment of taxes by the native converts (mawali), but this policy was opposed by the Khurasani Arabs themselves, and was reversed by Asad's successor Ashras ibn Abdallah al-Sulami. This led to a general uprising of Transoxiana in 728, and with Türgesh military aid the Arabs were evicted from almost the entire region. Transoxiana thereafter remained contested, and the Arabs did not recover their previous position until the campaigns of Nasr ibn Sayyar in 739–741, who took advantage of the collapse of the Türgesh Khaganate into civil wars after the murder of Suluk in 738.

== Sources ==
- Blankinship, Khalid Yahya, ed. (1989). The History of al-Ṭabarī, Volume XXV: The End of Expansion: The Caliphate of Hishām, A.D. 724–738/A.H. 105–120. SUNY Series in Near Eastern Studies. Albany, New York: State University of New York Press. ISBN 978-0-88706-569-9.
- Blankinship, Khalid Yahya (1994). The End of the Jihâd State: The Reign of Hishām ibn ʻAbd al-Malik and the Collapse of the Umayyads. Albany, New York: State University of New York Press. ISBN 978-0-7914-1827-7.
- Gibb, H. A. R. (1923). The Arab Conquests in Central Asia. London: The Royal Asiatic Society.
- Hawting, Gerald R. (2000). The First Dynasty of Islam: The Umayyad Caliphate AD 661–750 (Second ed.). London and New York: Routledge. ISBN 0-415-24072-7.
- Shaban, M. A. (1979). The 'Abbāsid Revolution. Cambridge: Cambridge University Press. ISBN 0-521-29534-3.
