= Khuttal =

Medieval region and principality in present-day southwest Tajikistan

Cultural Heritage Sites of Ancient Khuttal
UNESCO World Heritage Site
- Location within Tajikistan
- Location: Tajikistan
- Criteria: ii, iii
- Reference: 1627
- Inscription: 2025 (47th Session)
- Coordinates: 37.744°N 69.298°E

Khuttal, frequently also in the plural form Khuttalan (and variants such as Khutlan, Khatlan, in Chinese sources K'o-tut-lo) was a medieval region and principality on the north bank of the river Oxus (modern Amu Darya), lying between its tributaries Vakhsh and Panj. It corresponds roughly to the modern Khatlon Province of Tajikistan.

The pre-Islamic Principality of Khuttal played an active role, sometimes as an ally, sometimes as an enemy, of the Umayyads during the Muslim conquest of Transoxiana, and it was not until 750/1 that the Abbasids finally established direct control over it. A branch of the Banijurids of Tokharistan ruled over the area under the Abbasids, and acknowledged the suzerainty of the Samanids in the 10th century. The area apparently retained an autonomous line of rulers in the 11th–12th centuries, when it came first under the loose control of the Ghaznavids, and after the middle of the 11th century of the Seljuq Empire. With the decline of Seljuq power, Khuttal passed to the control of the Ghurids and the Khwarazmshahs, under whom no native princely line is known. In the 13th century Khuttal became a part of the Mongol Empire and of its successor, the Chagatai Khanate, emerging once again as an autonomous principality following the latter's disintegration in the mid-14th century. In the 16th century, the Shaybanids took over Khuttal, and the name itself ceases to be used, being replaced by Kulob.

In 2025, eleven archaeological sites associated with medieval Khuttal (including "Buddhist temples, palaces, settlements, manufacturing centres, and caravanserais") were designated as a World Heritage Site under the title "Cultural Heritage Sites of Ancient Khuttal".

== Sources ==
- Bosworth, C.E. (1986). "Khuttalān". The Encyclopedia of Islam, New Edition, Volume V: Khe–Mahi. Leiden and New York: BRILL. pp. 75–76. ISBN 90-04-07819-3.
- Bosworth, C. Edmund (2009). "ḴOTTAL". Encyclopædia Iranica, Online edition.
