= Khalid Yahya Blankinship =

American historian (born 1949)

Khalid Yahya Blankinship (born 1949 in Seattle, Washington) is an American historian who specialises in Islamic and Middle Eastern studies.

== Biography ==
He graduated (BA) in History from the University of Washington in 1973 and in the same year, while still in Seattle, converted to Islam.

In 1975 Blankinship received an MA in teaching English as a foreign language from the American University in Cairo, in 1983 a second MA in Islamic History from Cairo University and in 1988 a Ph.D. in History from the University of Washington. He was an advisor for the PBS-broadcast documentary Muhammad: Legacy of a Prophet (2002), produced by Unity Productions Foundation.

He has lived and traveled widely in the Middle East, including time in Egypt and Mecca, Saudi Arabia. He is currently a tenured professor of religion at Temple University.

== Bibliography ==
- Blankinship, Khalid Yahya, ed. (1989). The History of al-Ṭabarī, Volume XXV: The End of Expansion: The Caliphate of Hishām, A.D. 724–738/A.H. 105–120. SUNY Series in Near Eastern Studies. Albany, New York: State University of New York Press. ISBN 978-0-88706-569-9.
- Blankinship, Khalid Yahya, ed. (1993). The History of al-Ṭabarī, Volume XI: The Challenge to the Empires. SUNY Series in Near Eastern Studies. Albany, New York: State University of New York Press. ISBN 978-0-7914-0851-3.
- Blankinship, Khalid Yahya (1994). The End of the Jihâd State: The Reign of Hishām ibn ʻAbd al-Malik and the Collapse of the Umayyads. Albany, New York: State University of New York Press. ISBN 978-0-7914-1827-7.
- The Inimitable Qurʾān: Some Problems in English Translations of the Qurʾān with Reference to Rhetorical Features. Brill, 2019. ISBN 9004412522
- Murshid al-Qârî': A Reader’s Guide To Classical Muslim Religious Literature In English. Berkeley, CA: Lamppost Educational Initiative, 2021.
