= Battle of Samarkand =

Battle of Samarkand may refer to multiple battles of Samarkand:

- Battle of Samarkand (712), conquest of Samarkand by the Umayyads
- Battle of Samarkand (1598), between the Kazakh and Bukhara Khanates
- Battle of Samarkand (1613), between the Kazakh and Bukhara Khanates

== See also ==
- Capture of Samarkand (1740)
- Siege of Samarkand (disambiguation)
