= Ikhshids of Sogdia =

Series of rulers of Soghdia in Transoxiana

Ikhshids of Sogdia Unash
- 642–755 CE
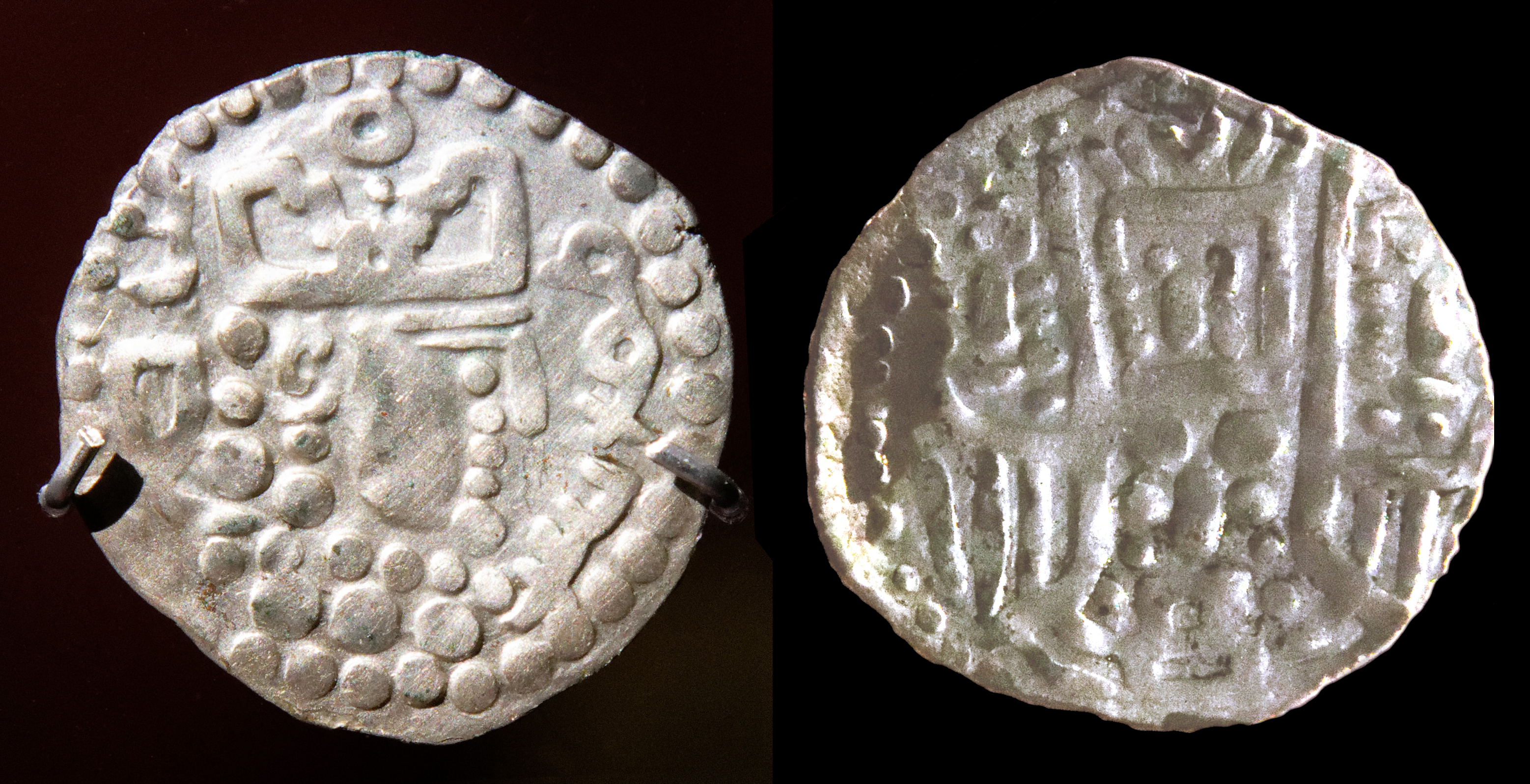
- Coin of Sogdian ruler Turgar, Ikhshid of Samarkand. Profile and name of the ruler on the obverse, fire altar with attendants on the reverse. Excavated in Penjikent, 8th century CE, National Museum of Antiquities of Tajikistan.

- Location of Samarkand, capital of the Ikhshids, and neighbouring polities.

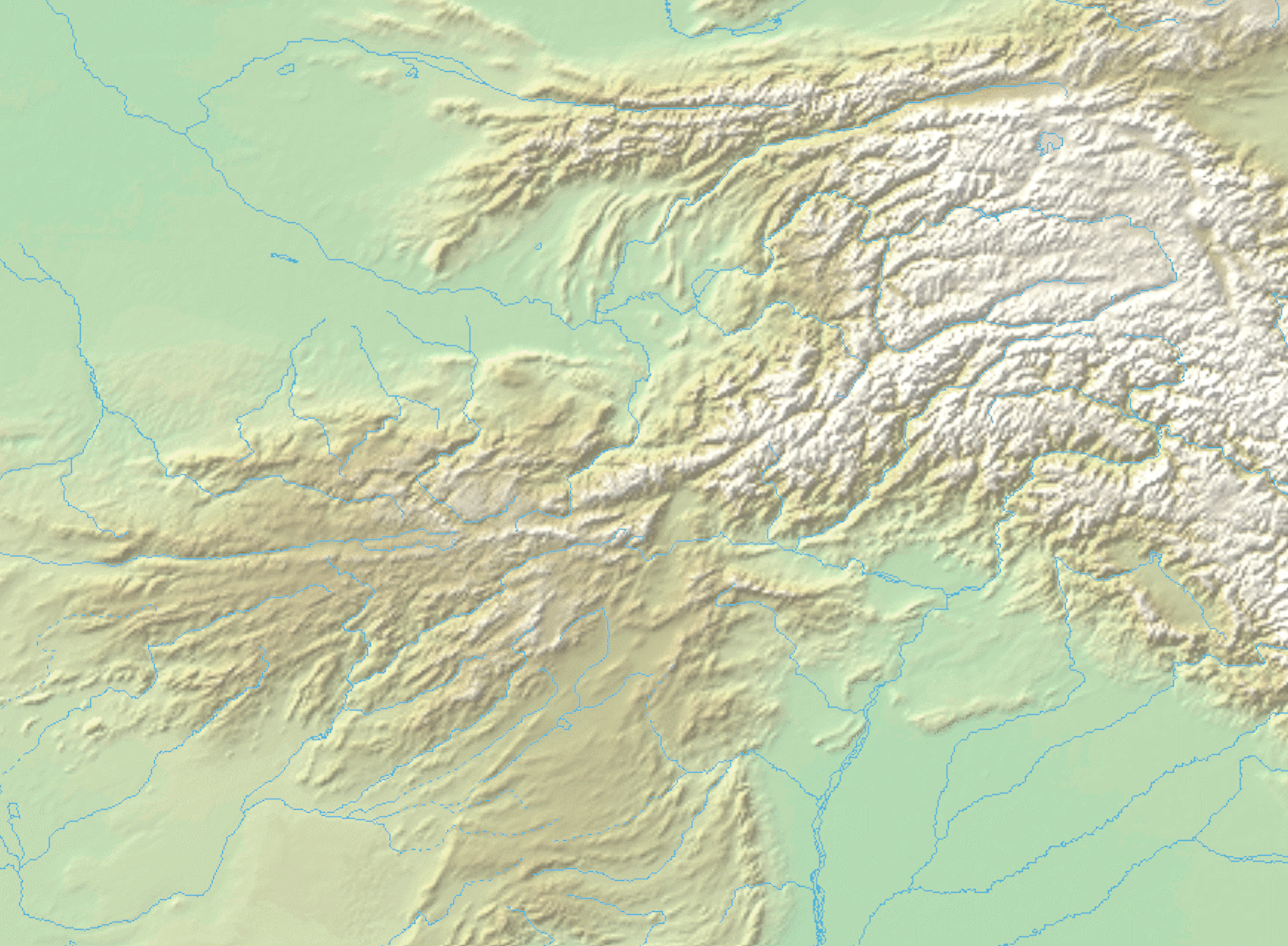
- The Ikhshids, and proximate polities and cities.
- Capital: Samarkand
- Common languages: Sogdian
- Religion: Zoroastrianism
- Historical era: Late antiquity
  - Established: 642
  - Disestablished: 755 CE
Preceded by	Succeeded by
Hephthalites; Western Turkic Khaganate	Umayyad Caliphate; Abbasid Caliphate

The Ikhshids of Sogdia, or Ikhshids of Samarkand, were a series of rulers of Soghdia in Transoxiana, with their capital at Samarkand, during the pre-Islamic and early Islamic periods.

The princely title "Ikhshid" (from Sogdian: xšyδ, xšēδ "Ruler") is of Iranian origin; scholars have derived it variously from the Old Iranian root khshaeta, "shining, brilliant", or from khshāyathiya, "ruler, king" (which is also the origin of the title shah). The Ikhshids of Soghdia, with their capital at Samarkand, are well attested during and after the Muslim conquest of Transoxiana. The rulers of the Principality of Farghana were also called "Ikhshids".

== Ikhshids dynasty of Sogdia ==
Shishpir, originally ruler of Kish, conquered Samarkand in 631-642 CE and founded the Ikhshid dynasty. His rule in Samarkand followed that of the Hephthalites who had taken control of the city since around 437 CE. The founder Shishpir was succeeded by several generations of kings, who are recorded in Chinese chronicles and known through their coinage.

The Hephthalite legacy appears in the coinage of Shishpir, as he adopted the Hephthalite Y-shaped tamgha on the reverse of his coins. The symbol of the Hephthalites thus appears on the residual coinage of Samarkand, probably as a consequence of the Hephthalite control of Sogdia, and becomes prominent in Sogdian coinage until the Muslim conquest of Transoxiana.

Inscriptions found in the ruins of the Ikhshid palace at Samarkand and the legends of coins suggest that the Ikhsids called their own dynasty "Unash", i.e. "Hunnish". The paintings of the Afrasiab murals, made in the early Ikhshid period, contain an inscription mentioning King "Varkhuman Unash"

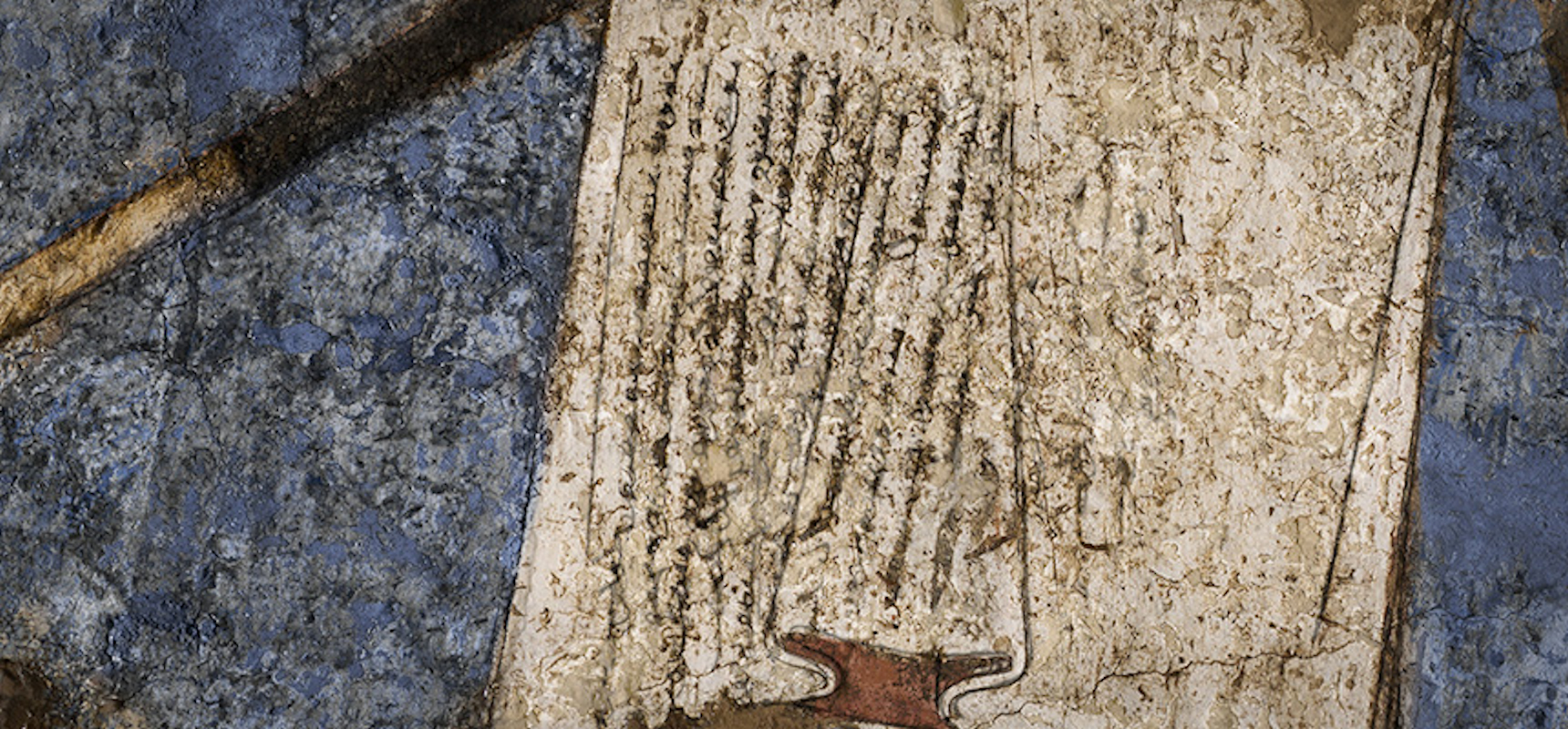
Afrasiab Sogdian inscription

When King Varkhuman Unash came to him [the ambassador] opened his mouth [and said thus]: "I am Pukarzate, the dapirpat (chancellor) of Chaganian. I arrived here from Turantash, the lord of Chaganian, to Samarkand, to the king, and with respect [to] the king [now] I am [here]. And with regard to me do not have any misgivings: About the gods of Samarkand, as well as about the writing of Samarkand I am keenly aware, and I also have not done any harm to the king. Let you be quite fortunate!" And King Varkhuman Unash took leave [of him]. And [then] the dapirpat (chancellor) of Chach opened his mouth.

— Inscription on an ambassador's robe, Afrasiab murals.

=== Afrasiab murals ===
The paintings of Afrasiab in Samarkand date back to the middle of the 7th century CE at the early stage of the Ilkhshid period, showing a reception of foreign dignitaries by Ikhshid king Varkhuman. They were probably painted circa 655 CE, as the Western Turkic Khaganate, members of which appear abundantly in the mural, was in its last days before its fall in 657 CE, and the Tang dynasty was increasing its territory in Central Asia. On the four walls of the room of a private house, three or four countries in neighbouring Central Asia are depicted. On the northern wall China (a Chinese festival, with the Empress on a boat, and the Emperor hunting), on the Southern Wall Samarkand (i.e.; the Iranian world: a religious funerary procession in honor of the ancestors during the Nowruz festival), on the eastern wall India (as the land of the astrologers and of the pygmies, but the painting is much destroyed there).

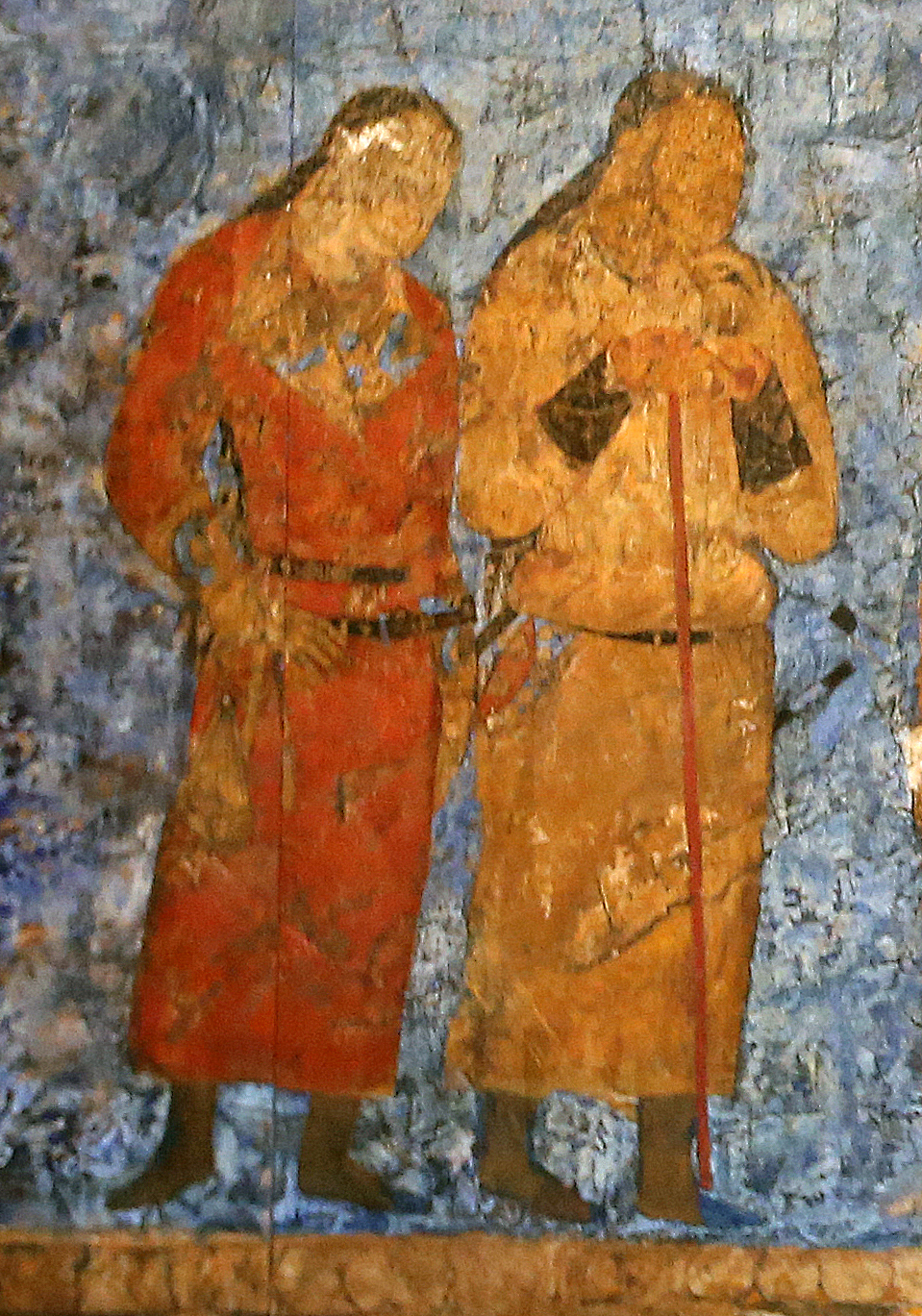
Western Turk officers escorting dignitaries visiting king Varkhuman in Samarkand. One of them is labeled as coming from Argi (Karashahr in modern Xinjiang). Afrasiab mural, probably painted circa 655 CE.

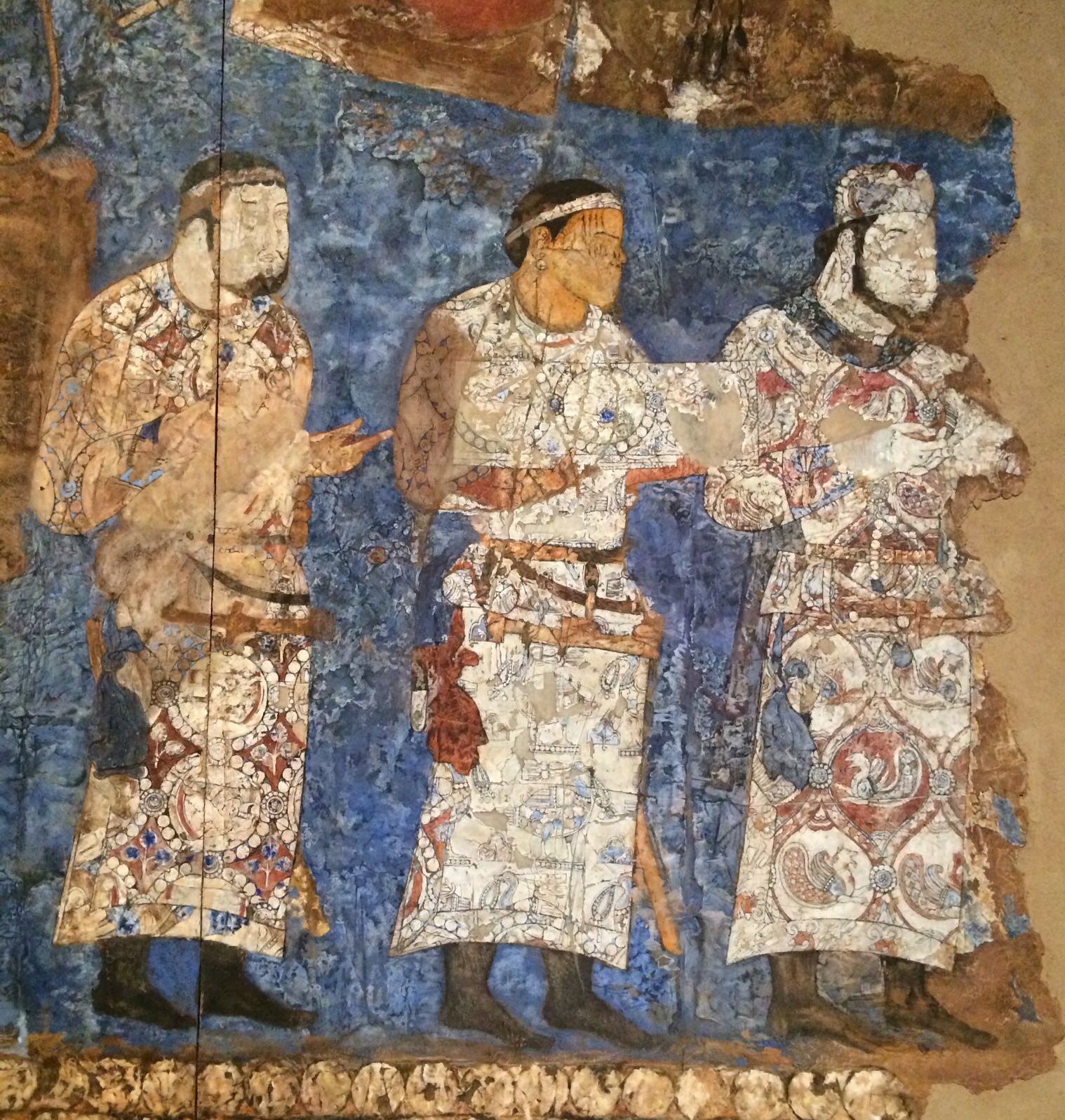
Ambassadors from Chaganian (central figure, inscription of the neck), and Chach (modern Tashkent) to king Varkhuman of Samarkand. Circa 655 CE, Afrasiyab murals, Samarkand.

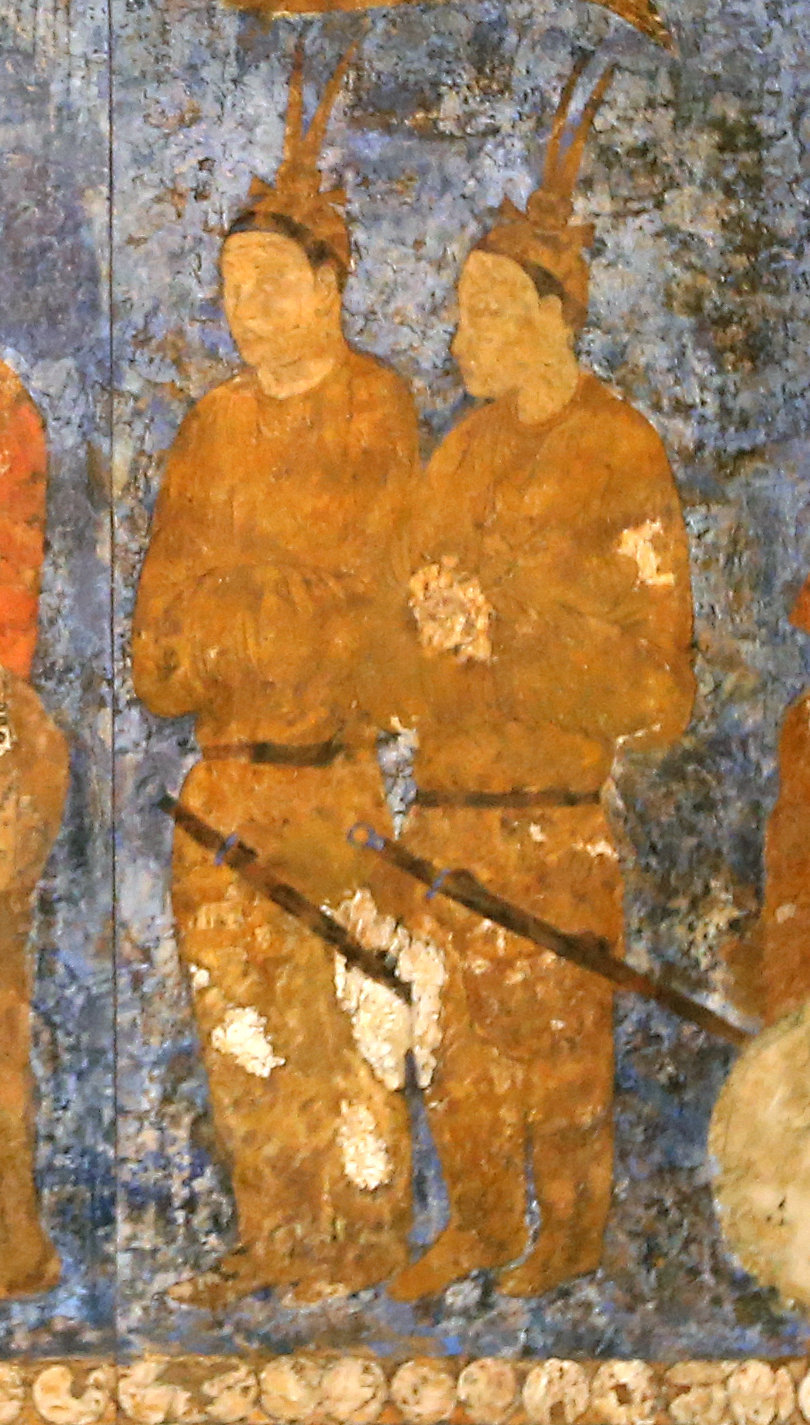
Korean ambassadors during an audience with king Varkhuman of Samarkand. They are identified by the two feathers on top of their head. Circa 655 CE, Afrasiyab, Samarkand.

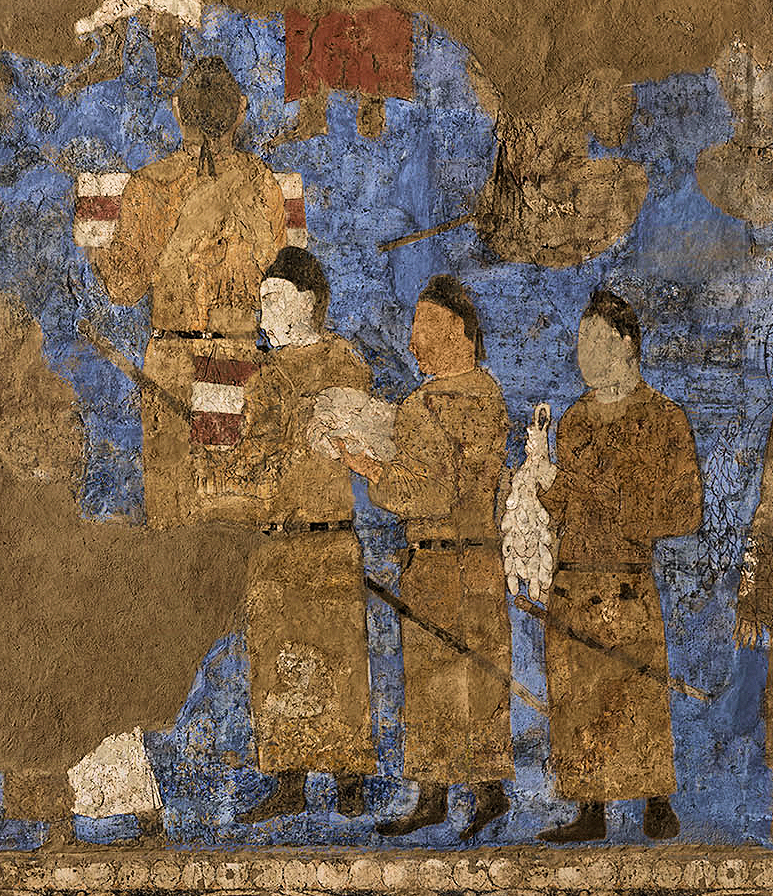
Tang dynasty emissaries at the court of Varkhuman in Samarkand carrying silk and a string of silkworm cocoons, circa 655 CE, Afrasiyab murals, Samarkand

== Chinese protectorate (from 658) ==
The Ikhshids became nominal vassals of the Chinese Tang dynasty. The Chinese asserted their political power in Central Asia at the expense of the Western Turks, through the establishment of the Anxi Protectorate and the formal appointment of local rulers to Governor positions in the provinces established by the Chinese. As soon as 650-655 CE, Varkhuman was recognized by the Chinese as "King of Kangju" (Sogdia), and Governor, as reported by Chinese chronicles:

During the Yonghui (永徽) era (650-655 CE), emperor Gaozong made this territory the Government of Kangju, and gave the title of Governor to the King of the country, Varkhuman (拂呼缦, Fúhūmàn).

— Chinese annals on Varkhuman.

The Western Turks, who had been the main power for about a century in the region, disintegrated following the Tang Conquest of the Western Turks and the demise of their ruler Ashina Helu in 658 CE, becoming vassals of the Chinese thereafter. The Tang dynasty would establish more or less nominal Protectorates and military garrisons throughout the area, but this control only lasted for a few years. By 662 rebellions broke out throughout the area, and the Western Turks were able to reestablish preeminence, with the Tangs only retaining sporadic and indirect control.

During this period, the Ikhshids and other Central Asian polities repeatedly requested Chinese military aid, especially against Muslim conquests, but these requests were generally met with empty promises, as the Chinese army, led by general Gao Xianzhi, was busy with the war against Tibet.

== Epilogue ==
The line survived into Abbasid times, although by then its seat was in Istikhan.

=== Ghurak ===
Among the most notable and energetic of the Soghdian kings was Ghurak, who in 710 overthrew his predecessor Tarkhun and for almost thirty years, through shifting alliances, managed to preserve a precarious autonomy between the expanding Umayyad Caliphate and the Türgesh khaganate.

In 718, Ghurak is known to have sent an embassy to the China court, asking for support against the Arabs, but military help was denied, probably because of the huge cost and distances involved:

"Then King Ghurak couldn't win in war against the Arabs. He came to plead for help, but the Emperor refused."

— New Book of Tang, Book 221.

In retaliation, the Arab governor may have appointed Divashtich, the ruler of nearby Panjikent, as ruler of Samarkand in order to replace Ghurak. Some of the coinage of Samarkand may have been issued by Divashtich, and may correspond to this period. The power of the Arabs in the region continued to increase, as they defeated the rebellion of Divastich in 722 CE.

=== Turgar ===
The reign of the last Ikhshid ruler Turgar seems to have enjoyed a relative period of prosperity, under the rather benevolent supervision of the Muslim Umayyad Governor Nasr ibn Sayyar. This continued until the revolt of Abu Muslim and the establishment of the Abbasid Caliphate in 750 CE, after which Sogdians had to convert to Islam.

Turgar sent an embassy to China in 750 CE, probably asking for support. Hopes of Chinese support for the Ikhshids soon evaporated, with their strategic defeat against the Arabs at the Battle of Talas and the dissolution of the Anxi Protectorate in 751 CE. With the domestic An Lushan Rebellion in 755 CE, the Chinese had to removed all of their remaining forces from Central Asia, depriving the Ikhshids of any kind of diplomatic support against the Arabs.

Turgar was probably deposed circa 755-757 CE, and stopped minting coinage. Coins of Arabo-Sogdian style were now being minted in Samarkand in the name of the Governor of Khurasan Abu Dawud Khalid ibn Ibrahim. The only Sogdian resistance now took the form of internal social or religious rebellions, within the framework of the Muslim Caliphate.

== Ikhshids of Sogdia ==
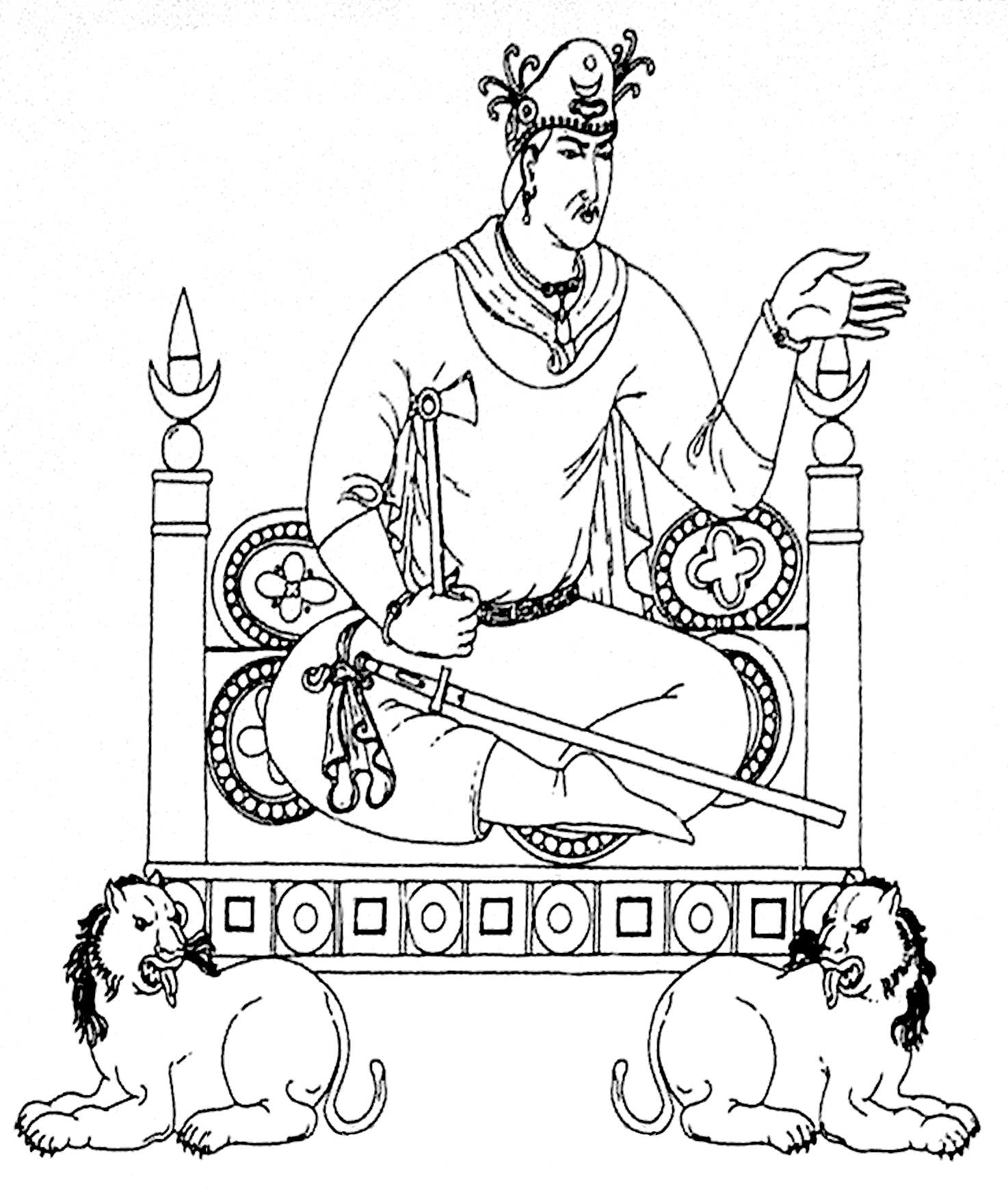
King Varkhuman Unash receiving foreign delegations, in the murals of Afrasiab, Samarkand, circa 655 CE (reconstitution)

Ruler	Date	Coinage	Coin legends	Chinese name	Transcription
Shishpir	642-655 CE		<šyšpyr MLKA> /šēšpēr xšēδ/	沙瑟毕	Shāsèbì
Varkhuman	655-696 CE		<(ʾ)βrγwmʾn MLKA> /(ə)warxumān xšēδ/	拂呼缦	Fúhūmàn
Urk Wartramuk	675-696 CE	Ikhshids of Samarkand. Ukar (Urk Vartramuka). Circa 675-696 CE	<ʾwrk wrtrmwk MLKA> /Urk Wartramuk xšēδ/
Tukaspadak	696-698 CE		<twkʾspʾδk MLKA> /Tōkəspāδak xšēδ/ /Tōkəspāδē xšēδ/	笃娑钵提	Dǔsuōbōtí
Mastich-Unash	698-700 CE		<mʾstn-nʾwyʾn MLKA> <mʾstc ʾwnš MLKA> /Mastič Unaš xšēδ/	泥涅师师	Nínièshīshī
Tarkhun	700-710 CE	Ikhshids of Samarkand. Tarkhun. Circa AD 700-710	<trγwn MLKA> /Tarxūn xšēδ/	突昏	Tūhūn
Ghurak	710-738 CE		<ʾwγrk MLKA> /Uγrak xšēδ/	乌勒伽和	Wǔlèkāhé
Turgar	738-755 CE		<twrγʾr MLKA> /Turγar xšēδ/	咄曷	Duōhé

== Coinage ==
The Ikhshids issues mostly copper coins on the Chinese model (Kaiyuan Tongbao type, round with a central square hole), with legends in Aramaic and Sogdian giving the name and title of the ruler. The Aramaic legend uses the title MLKA "King", the Sogdian legend uses the title xšēδ (Ikhshid, "Ruler"). The Ikhshids also issued a few silver coin on the Sasanian model, with face of the ruler on the obverse, and fire altar on the reverse. The Hunnic Y-shaped tamgha of the Hephthalites appears on the reverse of these coins. The second symbol (to the right) is the triskelion, symbol of Kish, from where Shishpir, the founder of the Ikhshids, originated.

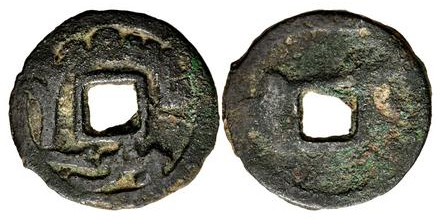
Coinage of Varkhuman, Ikhshid of Sogdia. Circa CE 650-675

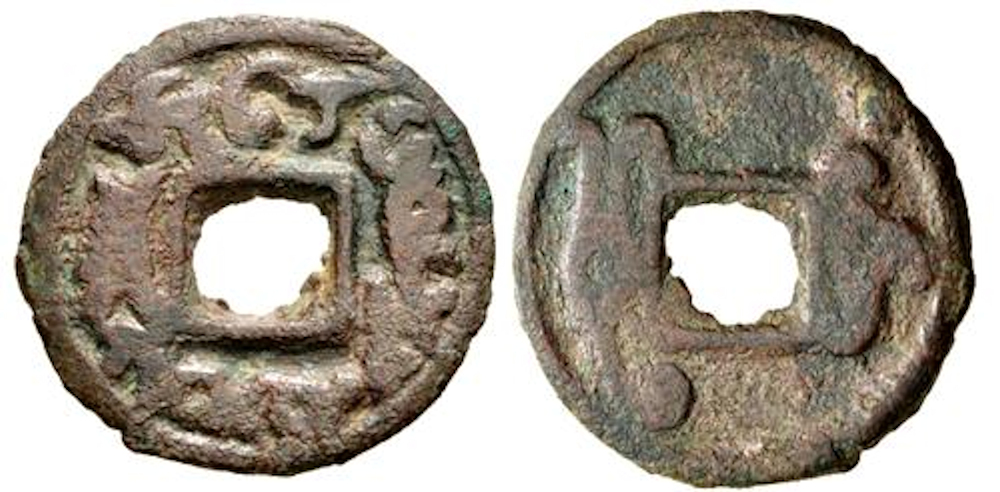
Coin in the name of Samarkand Ikhshid Ukar (Urk Vartramuka). The Hephthalite tamgha appears on the reverse, to left. Circa 675-696 CE.

== Other uses of the title "Ikhshid" ==
The Arab authors report that the title was also used by the ruler of Ferghana during the same period: Ibn al-Athir reports that it was the ikhshid of Ferghana who called upon the Chinese for aid against the Arabs, resulting in the Battle of Talas.

The title's prestige in Central Asia remained high as late as the 10th century, when it was adopted by the Turkic commander and ruler of Egypt Muhammad ibn Tughj, whose grandfather had come from Ferghana. After his title the short-lived dynasty founded by Muhammad al-Ikhshid is known as the Ikhshidid dynasty.

== Sources ==
- Bacharach, Jere L. (1993). "Muḥammad b. Ṭug̲h̲d̲j". In Bosworth, C. E.; van Donzel, E.; Heinrichs, W. P. & Pellat, Ch. (eds.). The Encyclopaedia of Islam, Second Edition. Volume VII: Mif–Naz. Leiden: E. J. Brill. p. 411. ISBN 978-90-04-09419-2.
- Bosworth, C. E. (1971). "Ik̲h̲s̲h̲īd". In Lewis, B.; Ménage, V. L.; Pellat, Ch. & Schacht, J. (eds.). The Encyclopaedia of Islam, Second Edition. Volume III: H–Iram. Leiden: E. J. Brill. p. 1060. OCLC 495469525.
- Gibb, H. A. R. (1923). The Arab Conquests in Central Asia. London: The Royal Asiatic Society.
- Rezakhani, Khodadad (2017a). ReOrienting the Sasanians: East Iran in Late Antiquity. Edinburgh University Press. ISBN 978-1-4744-0030-5.
