= Turgar =

8th-century King of Samarkand

- King of Samarkand
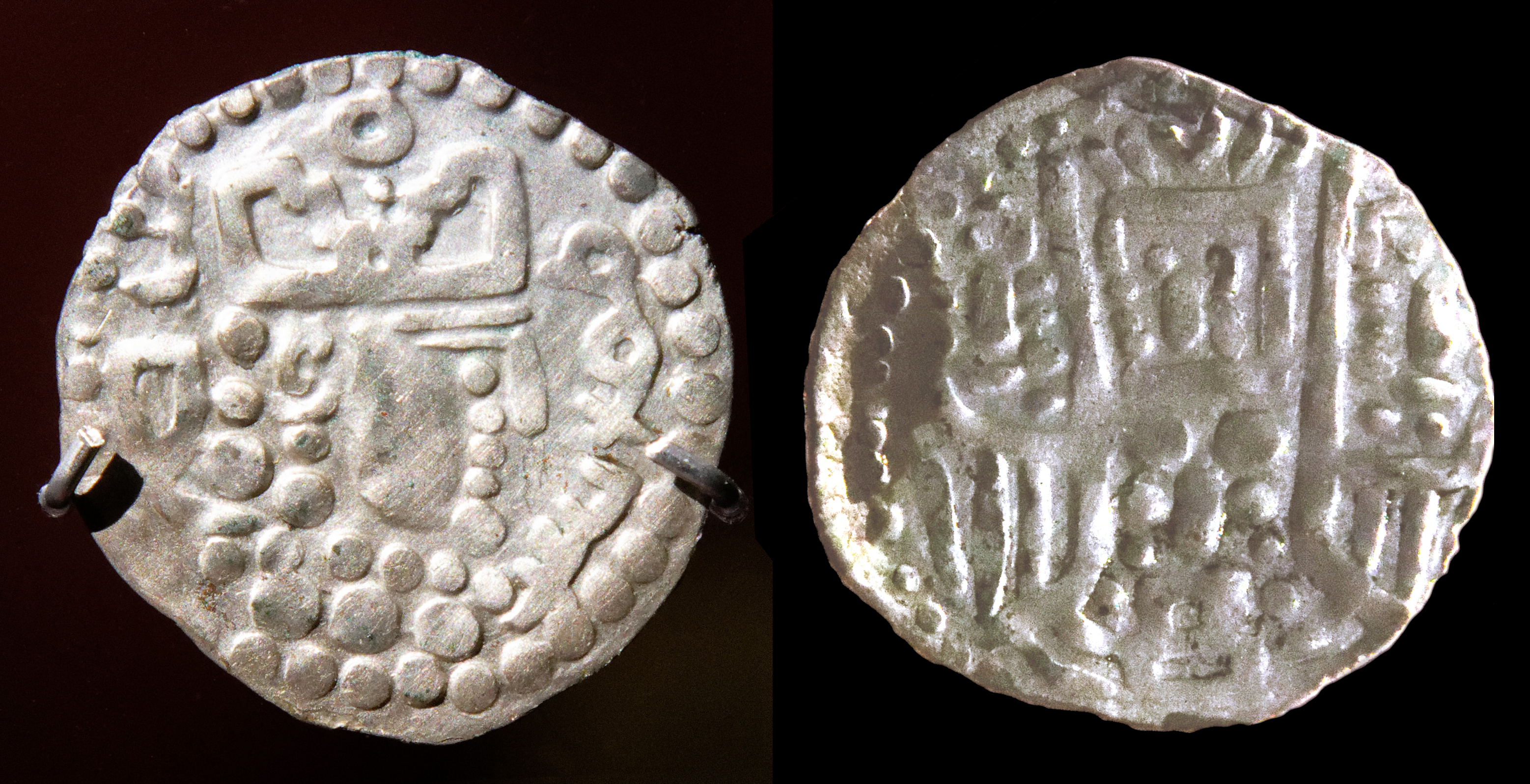
- Coin of Sogdian ruler Turgar, Ikhshid of Samarkand. Excavated in Penjikent, 8th century CE, National Museum of Antiquities of Tajikistan.
- Reign: 738–755/57
- Predecessor: Ghurak
- Successor: None
- Born: Samarkand, Sogdia
- Dynasty: Ikhshids
- Father: Ghurak
- Religion: Zoroastrianism

Tūrgār, also Thurgar (Sogdian: twrγ'r, Chinese: 咄曷 Duō-hé) was a medieval Sogdian ruler (an Ikhshid) in Transoxiana and successor to his father Ghurak during the period of the Muslim conquest of Transoxiana. He was the last ruler of Samarkand and its surroundings from ca. 738 until no later than 755/57, until the Arabs took full control of the region. He was an Ikhshid, a princely title of the Iranian rulers of Soghdia and the Ferghana Valley in Transoxiana during the pre-Islamic and early Islamic periods.

Turgar issued coinage with his own name in the legend. He was the last of the Ikhshid rulers to issue coinage. Many of his coins were found in the excavations of Penjikent.

Turgar was a successor of Gurak, who ruled in the period following the famous king Divashtich. Turgar's rule seems to have enjoyed a relative period of prosperity, under the rather benevolent supervision of the Muslim Umayyad Governor Nasr ibn Sayyar. This continued until the revolt of Abu Muslim and the establishment of the Abbasid dynasty, after which Sogdians had to convert to Islam.

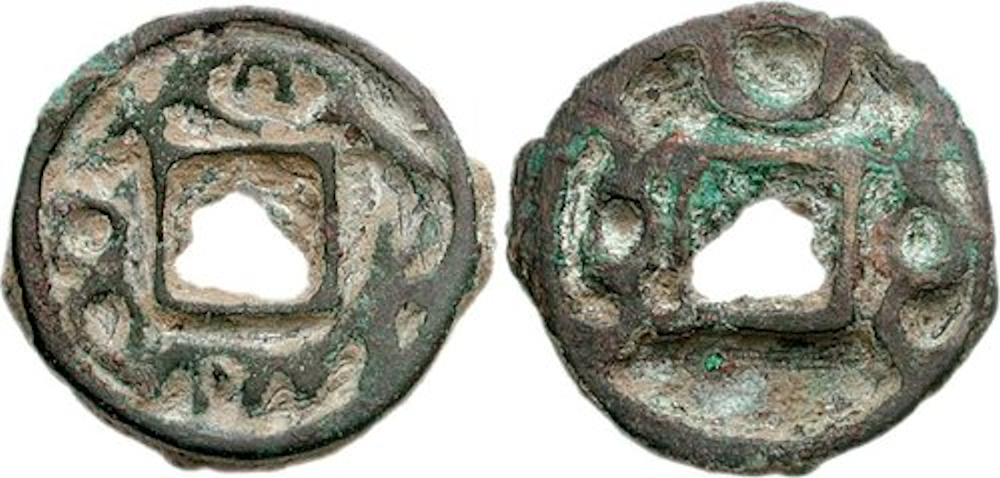
Another coin of Turgar, in Chinese style. Sogdian legend around central square hole. Tamghas and crescent around central square hole. Circa 738-755 CE.

== Sources ==
- Marshak, Boris (1994). "DĒWĀŠTĪČ". In Yarshater, Ehsan (ed.). Encyclopædia Iranica. Vol. VII/3: Dehqān I–Deylam, John of. London and New York: Routledge & Kegan Paul. pp. 334–335. ISBN 978-1-56859-021-9.
- B. A. Litvinsky, Ahmad Hasan Dani (1996). History of Civilizations of Central Asia: The crossroads of civilizations, A.D. 250 to 750. UNESCO. pp. 1–569. ISBN 9789231032110.
- Bulliet, R. W. (1984). "ĀL-E MĪKĀL". In Yarshater, Ehsan (ed.). Encyclopædia Iranica. Vol. I/7: Ahriman–Alafrank. London and New York: Routledge & Kegan Paul. p. 764. ISBN 978-0-71009-096-6.
- C.E., Bosworth (1993). "Mīkālīs". In Bosworth, C. E.; van Donzel, E.; Heinrichs, W. P. & Pellat, Ch. (eds.). The Encyclopaedia of Islam, Second Edition. Volume VII: Mif–Naz. Leiden: E. J. Brill. ISBN 978-90-04-09419-2.
- Marshak, Boris (2002). "PANJIKANT". In Yarshater, Ehsan (ed.). Encyclopædia Iranica (Online ed.). Encyclopædia Iranica Foundation.
- Hansen, Valerie (2012). The Silk Road. Oxford University Press. pp. 1–304. ISBN 9780195159318. "Diwashini."
- Yakubovich, Ilya (2002). "Mugh 1.I. Revisited". Studia Iranica. 31 (2): 231–253. doi:10.2143/SI.31.2.270.
- Bacharach, Jere L. (1993). "Muḥammad b. Ṭug̲h̲d̲j". In Bosworth, C. E.; van Donzel, E.; Heinrichs, W. P. & Pellat, Ch. (eds.). The Encyclopaedia of Islam, Second Edition. Volume VII: Mif–Naz. Leiden: E. J. Brill. p. 411. ISBN 978-90-04-09419-2.
- Bosworth, C. E. (1971). "Ik̲h̲s̲h̲īd". In Lewis, B.; Ménage, V. L.; Pellat, Ch. & Schacht, J. (eds.). The Encyclopaedia of Islam, Second Edition. Volume III: H–Iram. Leiden: E. J. Brill. p. 1060. OCLC 495469525.
- Gibb, H. A. R. (1923). The Arab Conquests in Central Asia. London: The Royal Asiatic Society.

Preceded by Gurak	Ruler of Samarkand; 738–755/57	Abbasid dynasty Abu Muslim
