= Siege of Samarkand =

Siege of Samarkand may refer to multiple sieges of Samarkand:

- Siege of Samarkand (712), in which Arabs capture the city
- Siege of Samarkand (1220), in which the Mongols captured the city
- Siege of Samarkand (1490s), a siege or series of two sieges of the city in either 1494 or 1496
- Siege of Samarkand (1497), a siege of the city in May 1497 in which Babur captured the city
- Siege of Samarkand (1501), a siege of the city in 1501 in which Babur failed to capture the city
- Siege of Samarkand (1868), a nine-day siege in which a Russian garrison repelled an attacking army of the Bukharan Emirate

== See also ==
- Battle of Samarkand (disambiguation)
- Capture of Samarkand (1740)
