= Abu al-Fayz Khan =

Khan of Bukhara from 1711 to 1747

Abu al-Fayz Khan (Chagatai and Persian: ابو الفیض خان; 1687-1747) was the Janid ruler of the Khanate of Bukhara from 1711 to 1747. It was during the rule of Abu al-Fayz Khan that Janid rule lost its authority in the khanate of Bukhara.

== Defeat by Nader Shah ==
Abu al-Fayz surrendered the khanate to Nader Shah in 1740 in response to Nader Shah's broader conquest of central Asia. Some accounts say that Abu al-Fayz surrendered without a fight, others say that he was defeated in battle. The two rulers reached an agreement in which Abu al-Fayz was confirmed as king of Turkestan, Nader Shah married Abu al-Fayz's daughter, and Muhammad Hakim Khan, a quasi-independent governor of Qarshi, was appointed as the ataliq. By the time Nader Shah defeated Abu al-Fayz, the khanate of Bukhara existed only in name. Samarkand, Hisar, and Shahrisabz had had de facto independence for decades prior. Nader Shah did not help the economic status of Bukhara and instead exhausted Bukhara's resources for his own war campaigns. Abu al-Fayz saw this as an opportunity to remove his own political competition, and suggested that Nader Shah conscript tribal leaders that were politically troublesome for Abu al-Fayz.

== Execution by Muhammad Rahim Bey ==
After rebellions broke out in Transoxania in 1743 that lead to the death of Muhammad Hakim, Nader Shah sent Hakim's son, Muhammad Rahim Bey, with 4,000 Qizilbash to help Abu al-Fayz Khan pacify the rebellions. After the death of Nader Shah in 1747, Muhammad Rahim Bey executed Abu al-Fayz Khan and established the Mangit dynasty.
