= Battle of Pitnak =

18th c. military conflict

- Part of Nader Shah's Central Asian campaign and Campaigns of Nader Shah
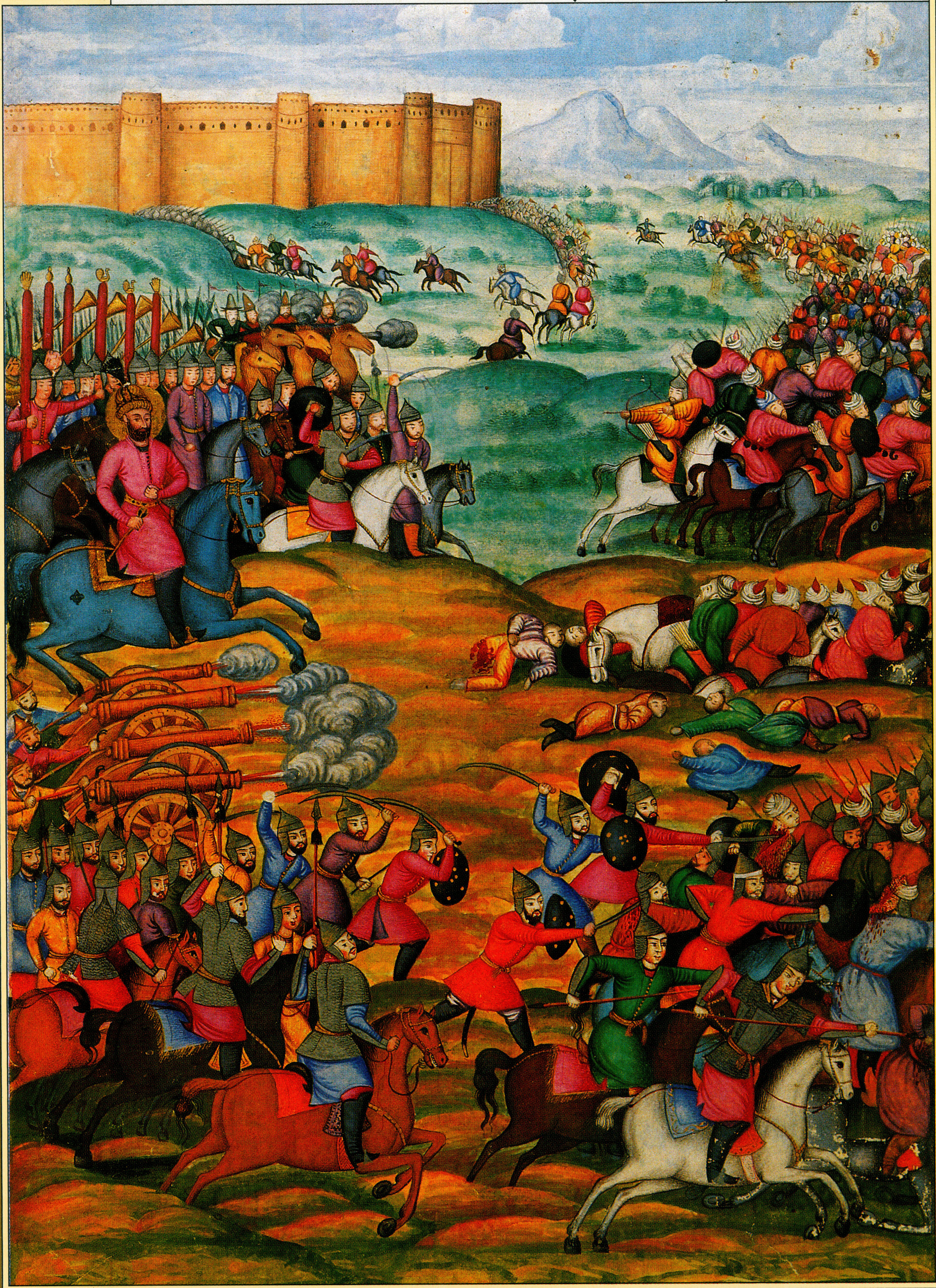
- Picture of Nader Shah's battle against Ilbars Khan II
Date	1740
Location	Pitnak, Uzbekistan
Result	Persian victory: Central Asian Khanates became dependent on Nader Shah.

Belligerents
Afsharid Iran	Khanate of Khiva

Commanders and leaders
(Afsharid Iran) Nader Shah	Ilbars Khan II (executed)

The Battle of Pitnak was fought in 1740 between Nader Shah and Ilbars Khan II, the ruler of the Khiva Khanate. Fought at Pitnak, now in Uzbekistan, the battle took place within the framework of Nader's Central Asian campaign.

== Background ==
When Nader was in India, the warriors of the Khanate of Khiva periodically attacked and plundered Khorasan. In response to this, the crown prince of Nader Shah in Khorasan, Rza Qoli Mirza Afshar, marched into Central Asia and won a victory. But Nader did not allow him to continue his attacks. because his goal was to return and carry out a larger campaign under his command.

After returning from a great victory in India, Nader marched into Central Asia. His target was Bukhara judge Abulfaz Khan and Khiva judge Ilbars Khan. At the end of 1740, Abulfaz Khan was defeated. Abulfaz Khan, who declared that he would submit to Nader after he was defeated, was placed on the head of Turkestan rulership. Although such an offer was made to Ilbars Khan, he rejected this offer.

== First collisions ==
While Nader Shah was still in Bukhara, he wrote to Ilbars Khan and asked him to follow him as Abulfaz Khan, but this offer was rejected. Ilbars Khan also decided to send a 30,000-strong detachment of Uzbek, Aral, Yomut and Turkmen cavalry under the leadership of Muhammad Ali Khan Kidil to Charjo. This group had a duty to reach Charjo faster than Nader Shah's army, destroy the passage over the Amu Darya, and thereby make it difficult for Nader Shah's troops to cross the river. Ilbars Khan was sure that he would scatter Nader Shah's troops with his army under the leadership of Muhammad Ali Khan and force him to retreat. When that group of troops reached the distance of 6 miles from Charjo, Nader Shah learned about the situation. It was clear that the capture of the crossing over the Amu Darya near Charjo would complicate Nader Shah's march to Khwarazm. Therefore, Nader Shah left behind the cargo and supplies of the troops and accelerated the movement towards Charjo with his group of experienced warriors. The baggage and supplies left behind were to continue the movement with the accompanying party and join Nader Shah at Charjo. Rza Qoli Mirza was entrusted with the leadership of that group. There were 20,000 warriors in the detachment under the leadership of Nader Shah. In addition, Nader Shah sent a message to Muhammad Reza Khan Qirkhli, Beylerbey of Merv, to join him with the 3,000-strong Merv detachment assigned to guard the Charjo area. Since the people of Merv are constantly at enmity with the Turkmen or Uzbek tribes, Nader Shah considered it useful to use the Merv detachment against those tribes.

Nader Shah was also aware that Ilbars Khan had a strong and fighting army. Therefore, during the movement towards Charjo, he ensured the protection of the troops from the flanks, rear and front, as well as the compact movement of the troops. In time, Nader Shah reached Charjo, called the Amu Darya river and camped on the other bank. After a day, the remaining forces came and caught up with him. After reaching Charjo, Nader Shah agreed to the return of Rza Qoli Mirza. After completing the necessary organizational work in Charjo, Nader Shah moved with his army to the place called Deveboyunu valley. Before leaving, he regrouped the army and the entire army was divided into four large groups. The main part of the troops was advancing behind this group. The other two groups formed flank guard groups. In addition, a detachment of 6,000 people moved along the coast and provided protection for the ship carrying supplies in the river. When they reached Deveboyunu valley, Nader Shah ordered the troops to stop, and by his order, the loads of the troops were gathered together and a special detachment was assigned to guard it. Nader Shah's arrival at Deveboyunu valley coincides with the last days of October 1740.

In the battle between the vanguard units of both armies, Nader's units won.

== Battle ==
Opposite parties came face to face near Fetang castle. Before the battle began, both sides grouped their forces. The center, right and left flanks, ambush and reserve force were determined, each of them was entrusted to experienced generals. A group of 6,000 Yomut warriors was one of the first to join the battle as the wheelwrights of the Ilbar's troops. They cut off the movement paths of Nader Shah's troops and caused the battle to heat up. The warriors of Yomut showed such determination that they were able to break the resistance of Nader Shah's troops in two directions of the front and advance. In order to prevent the progress of the Yomuts from becoming dangerous, Nader Shah himself immediately rushed to the battlefield and advanced towards the Yomut troops. Nader Shah was accompanied by Afshar, Marv and Atak cavalry, who were always subject to marauding raids by the Yomut and Turkestan cavalry and were looking for an opportunity to take revenge on the Yomut. With this step, Nader Shah created a force advantage in the direction where the Yomuts were temporarily successful, and very soon that force advantage turned into a military advantage. A serious blow was inflicted on the Yomuts, who were eager to advance, and a wave was put in their ranks. The tension on the battlefield increased while Nader Shah entering the battle. In general, although it is impossible to create a real picture of what happened around the Fetang fortress, it is known that the success achieved by Nader Shah in the direction in which he participated in the battle had an impact on the overall result. After meeting Nader Shah's stiff resistance, Yomut warriors were forced to retreat. Their action had an effect on the other groups, and Ilbars Khan had to run back in the next confrontation, helpless before the bravery of Nader Shah's troops. Many were killed and captured during the pursuit of his forces. Ilbars Khan saved his troops from destruction when they reached Hezarasb fortress.

== Result ==
Nader defeated Ilbars Khan's troops as a result of this battle. Hezarasb fortress, where Ilbars Khan later took refuge, and Khanegah fortress were captured by Nader. Finally, Ilbars Khan, who had exhausted all his forces, was captured and executed by Nader.

== See also ==
- Campaigns of Nader Shah
- Nader Shah's Central Asian campaign
