= Ikhshid =

Sogdian title

Ikhshid (Persian: اخشید; from Sogdian: xšyδ, əxšēδ) was the princely title of the Iranian rulers of Soghdia and the Ferghana Valley in Transoxiana during the pre-Islamic and early Islamic periods. The title is of Iranian origin; scholars have derived it variously from the Old Iranian root khshaeta, lit. 'shining, brilliant', or from khshāyathiya, 'ruler, king' (which is also the origin of the title 'shah'). These Old Iranian terms are etymologically related to the Sanskrit word Kshatriya (literally meaning "ruler, authority"), the Hindu caste of warriors and princes.

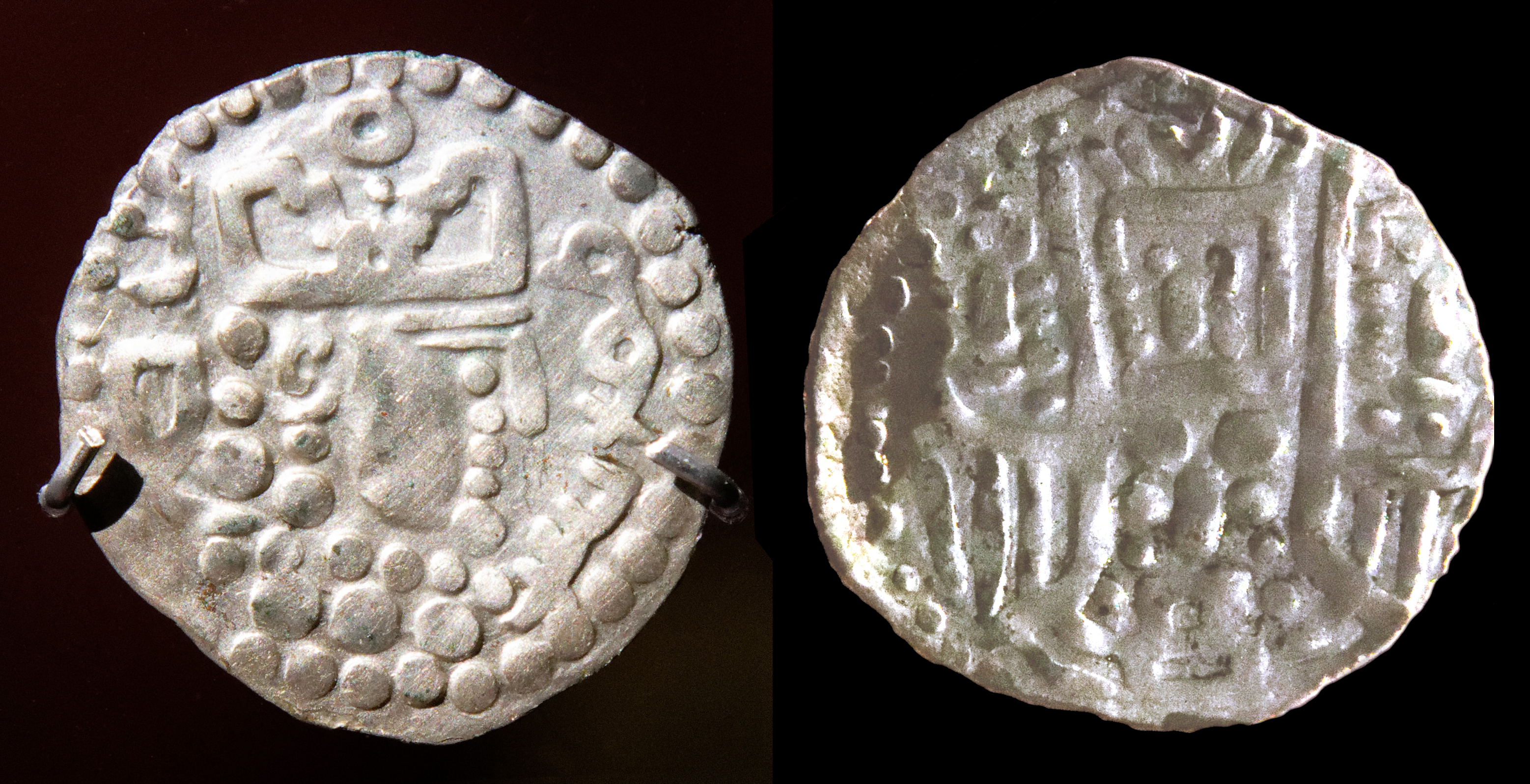
Coin of ruler Turgar, Ikhshid of Sogdia.

The Ikhshids of Sogdia, with their capital at Samarkand, are well attested during and after the Muslim conquest of Transoxiana. The line survived into Abbasid times, although by then its seat was in Istikhan. Among the most notable and energetic of the Soghdian kings was Gurak, who in 710 overthrew his predecessor Tarkhun and for almost thirty years, through shifting alliances, managed to preserve a precarious autonomy between the expanding Umayyad Caliphate and the Türgesh khaganate.

Also, The ruler of Kāš (Kashgar) in the late 8th century, according to the Middle Persian Manichean text Mahrnāmag (Müller, lines 75-76), was called xšy∂ (‘ruler’ in Sogdian), with the title “Head of Auditors” and the name lyfwtwšy, which is possibly Chinese. In the early 3rd century, Kashgar became a major power center in the "Western Regions". However, by the mid-3rd century, as per an inscription by Shapur I, Kashgar was likely the easternmost point of the Persian Sasanian Empire.

The Arab authors report that the title was also used by the ruler of the Principality of Farghana during the same period: Ibn al-Athir reports that it was the ikhshid of Ferghana who called upon the Chinese for aid against the Arabs, resulting in the Battle of Talas.

The title's prestige in Central Asia remained high as late as the 10th century, when it was adopted by the Turkic commander and ruler of Egypt Muhammad ibn Tughj, whose grandfather had come from Ferghana. After his title the short-lived Egyptian dynasty founded by Muhammad al-Ikhshid is known as the Ikhshidid dynasty.

== Sources ==
- Bacharach, Jere L. (1993). "Muḥammad b. Ṭug̲h̲d̲j". In Bosworth, C. E.; van Donzel, E.; Heinrichs, W. P. & Pellat, Ch. (eds.). The Encyclopaedia of Islam, Second Edition. Volume VII: Mif–Naz. Leiden: E. J. Brill. p. 411. doi:10.1163/1573-3912_islam_SIM_5369. ISBN 978-90-04-09419-2.
- Bosworth, C. E. (1971). "Ik̲h̲s̲h̲īd". In Lewis, B.; Ménage, V. L.; Pellat, Ch. & Schacht, J. (eds.). The Encyclopaedia of Islam, Second Edition. Volume III: H–Iram. Leiden: E. J. Brill. p. 1060. doi:10.1163/1573-3912_islam_SIM_3513. OCLC 495469525.
- Gibb, H. A. R. (1923). The Arab Conquests in Central Asia. London: The Royal Asiatic Society. OCLC 499987512.
