= Kal'ai Mug =

Archaeological site in Tajikistan

Coordinates: 39.439081°N 68.273353°E

Kal'ai Mug is an archaeological site and ruins of a fortress on Mount Mug or Mugh, the Mountain of Magicians or the Magus Mount, beside the Zeravshan River in Tajikistan. It is located about 60 kilometers east of Panjakent, three kilometers from the village of Khairabad.

The fort was located in 1932 when local shepherds in search of treasure discovered some documents in a pit containing a basket. The illiterate shepherds brought one intact paper with them and returned the basket to where they had found it. They shared the paper with a literate villager who took a photo, which somehow made its way to Leningrad where it landed on the desk of an expert in ancient languages, Corresponding Member of the USSR Academy of Sciences, Alexander Freiman. Freiman led an expedition to the site in autumn 1933 which found documents in Sodgian, Arabic, Turkic and Chinese.

The fort is significant as it was the last stronghold of the confederacy of five Sogdian kingdoms to resist the Islamic invasion in 722. When the fort was breached, it was filled with refugees and the king Divashtich was executed in the main square of the fort.

The fort was originally a two-story building made of stone and brick measuring 18.5 × 19.5 m and dates to the 8th century. An aerial view of the fortress shows some of the remains.
