= Alexander Freiman =

Alexander Arnoldovich Freiman (Russian: Александр Арнольдович Фрейман; August 22, 1879, Warsaw – January 19, 1968, Leningrad) was a Polish-Soviet researcher of the Iranian languages.

In 1933, Freiman led an expedition to Kal'ai Mug in Tajikistan after receiving a photo of a document that had been found on the mountain. This led to the discovery of the ancient fortress, some artifacts and multiple documents written in Sogdian (81), Arabic (1), one Turkic (1), and Chinese (several).

== Literary works ==
- The editor of Sogdiysky sbornik, 1934
- Zadachi iranskoy filologii, 1946
- Chorezmsky yazyk. Materially i issledovaniya, 1951
- Osetinsko-russko-nemetsky slovar', 3 vols., 1927–1934
