= Divashtich =

- King of Panjikant
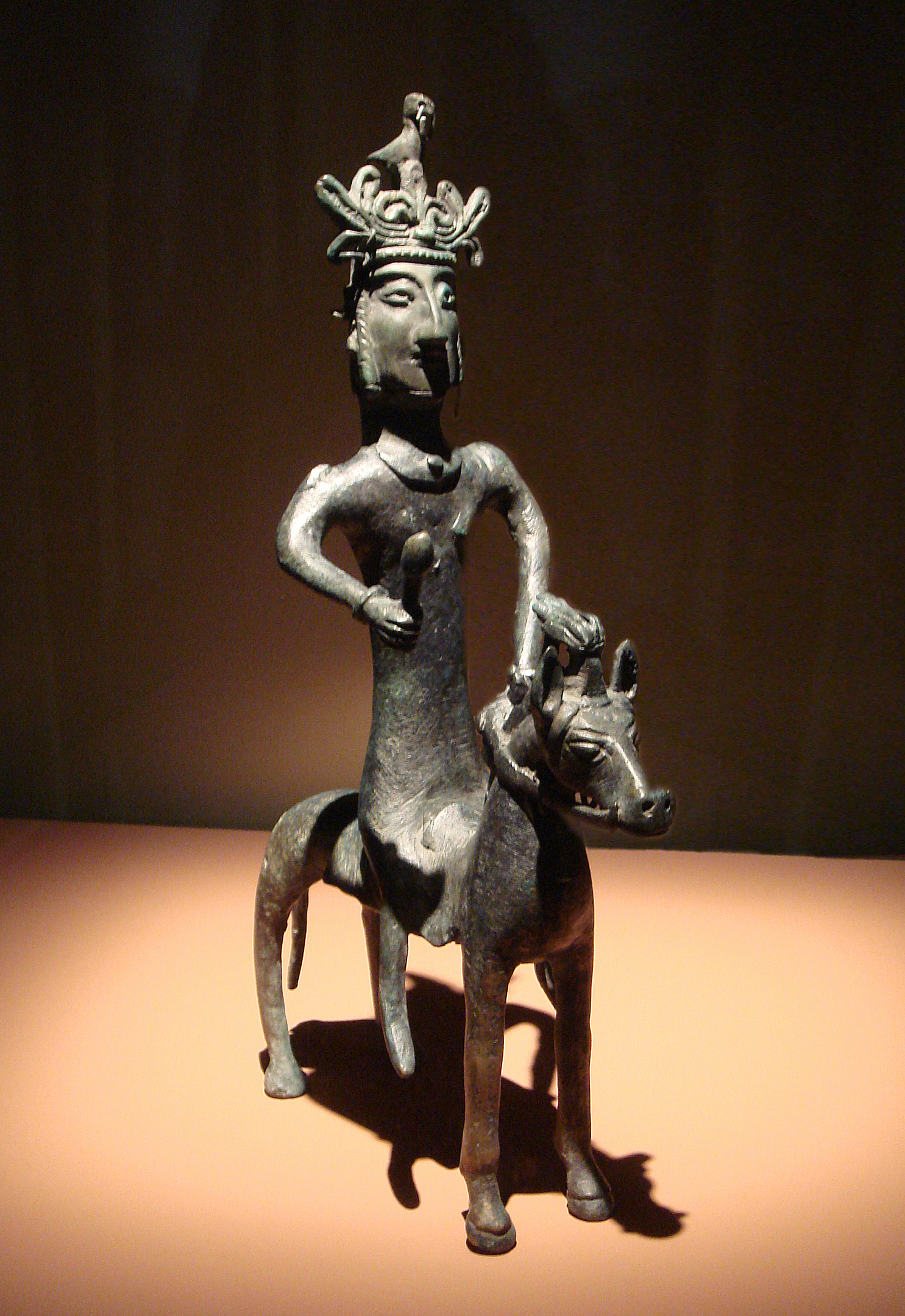
- Possible Sogdian King Devashtish or God Verethranga, Aini district, Tajikistan, 7-8th century CE, National Museum of Antiquities of Tajikistan (A 1060).
- Reign: 706–722
- Predecessor: Chukin Chur Bilga
- Successor: Umayyad conquest
- Born: Samarkand, Sogdia
- Died: 722; Rabinjan, Sogdia
- Spouse: Nandimanpan (nnδβ'mpnh)
- Issue: Tarkhun
- Father: Yodkhsetak
- Religion: Zoroastrianism

Divashtich (also spelled Devashtich, Dewashtich, and Divasti), was a medieval Sogdian ruler in Transoxiana during the period of the Muslim conquest of Transoxiana. He was the ruler of Panjikant and its surroundings from ca. 706 until his downfall and execution in the autumn of 722. Panjikant reached the height of its prosperity during his rule.

== Origin ==
Divashtich was the son of a certain Yodkhsetak, who belonged to a noble Sogdian dehqan family from Samarkand, which could trace its descent back to the Sasanian king Bahram V Gur (r. 420–438). The family bore the title of sur and began ruling parts of Sogdia during the 6th century. There were five members of the family bearing the title of sur, Divashtich being the last of them.

== Dispute with Samarkand and the Arabs ==
In ca. 706, Divashtich was elected as king of Panjikant, succeeding the Turkic prince Chukin Chur Bilga as the ruler of city. However, Divashtich did not hold absolute power, and shared his power with other princes. Although Divashtich only ruled Panjikant, he claimed the title of "Sogdian king", and "ruler of Samarkand". Some of Divashtich's coins included the name of a certain Nana, which either was the goddess Nanaya, or Chukin Chur Bilga's daughter, whom Divashtich may have been married to.

In 709/710, Tarkhun, the Sogdian ruler of Samarkand, was overthrown by a rebellion because of his pro-Muslim policy, and was succeeded by another Sogdian prince named Gurak. After the fall of Tarkhun, his two sons fled to the court of Divashtich, where they were treated honorably. This made Divashtich's claim to Samarkand much stronger. In ca. 712, Divashtich, including other local Sogdian rulers such as Gurak, acknowledged the authority of the Umayyad Caliphate after an invasion by the Arab general Qutayba ibn Muslim.

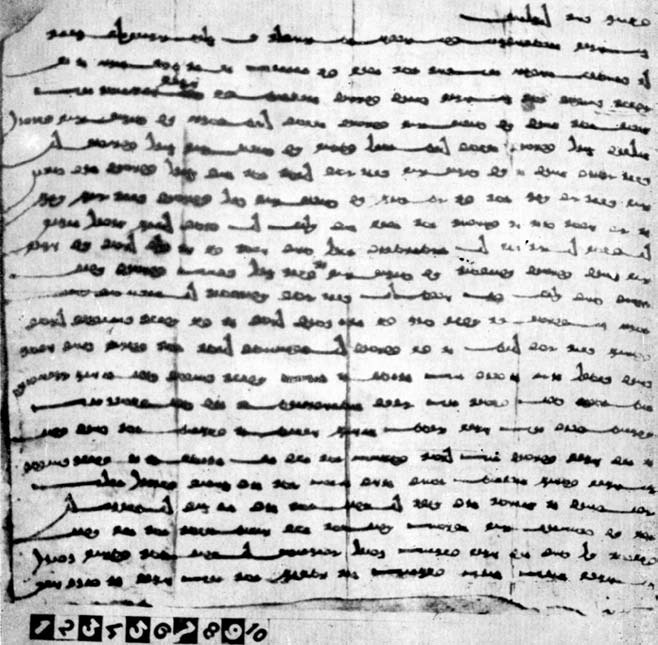
Letter of an Arab Emir to Devashtich, found in Mount Mugh

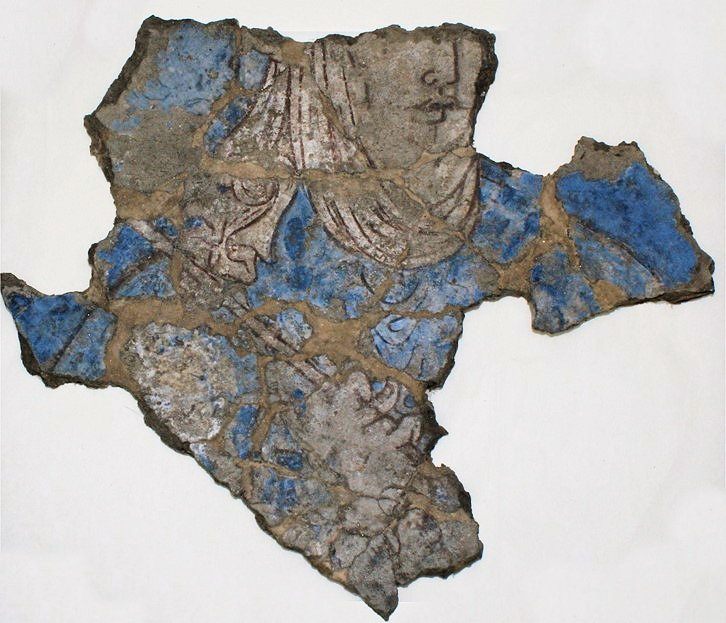
Wealthy Arab, Palace of Devashtich, Penjikent murals

While Gurak tried to break from Umayyad suzerainty and request aid from the Tang dynasty, Divashtich remained loyal to the Arabs, and his relations seems to have been so great with them that he was even considered a Muslim. In 719, he was forced to send the two sons of Tarkhun to al-Jarrah ibn Abdallah, the Umayyad governor of Khorasan. As late as 721, Divashtich was in correspondence with Abd al-Rahman ibn Nu'aym al-Ghamidi, the new governor of Khorasan, who flatteringly addressed him as King of Sogdia and ruler of Samarkand, possibly trying to assure or win back his loyalty.

== Rebellion and death ==
In 720, Divashtich, along with another Sogdian ruler named Karzanj, are mentioned as the leaders of an anti-Arab rebellion in Sogdia. They managed to earn the allegiance of at-Tar, the Sogdian ruler of Farghana, who promised to give them protection in case their rebellion turned into a failure. While the army of Karzanj was staying at Khujand, at-Tar betrayed him, and told the Umayyad general Sa'id ibn Amr al-Harashi where Karzanj and his army was stationing. Al-Harashi quickly marched towards Khujand, where he defeated the army of Karzanj, brutally massacring over 3,000 Sogdian inhabitants in the city.

Al-Harashi then left for Zarafshan, the location of Divashtich. A battle shortly took place near the city in 722, where al-Harashi managed to emerge victorious once again. Divashtich then fled to a fortress on Mount Mugh called Kal'ai Mug along the Zarafshan River, about 60 kilometers from Panjakent, but eventually agreed to surrender to Arabs, and was taken prisoner, where he was treated well. The Arabs then began burning several houses and a temple in Panjakent.

The Umayyad governor of Iraq, including other high officials, wanted to set Divashtich free. Al-Harashi, however, had Divashtich crucified on a Zoroastrian burial building, and sent his head to Iraq. This choice later played a role of al-Harashi's removal as the governor of Khorasan.

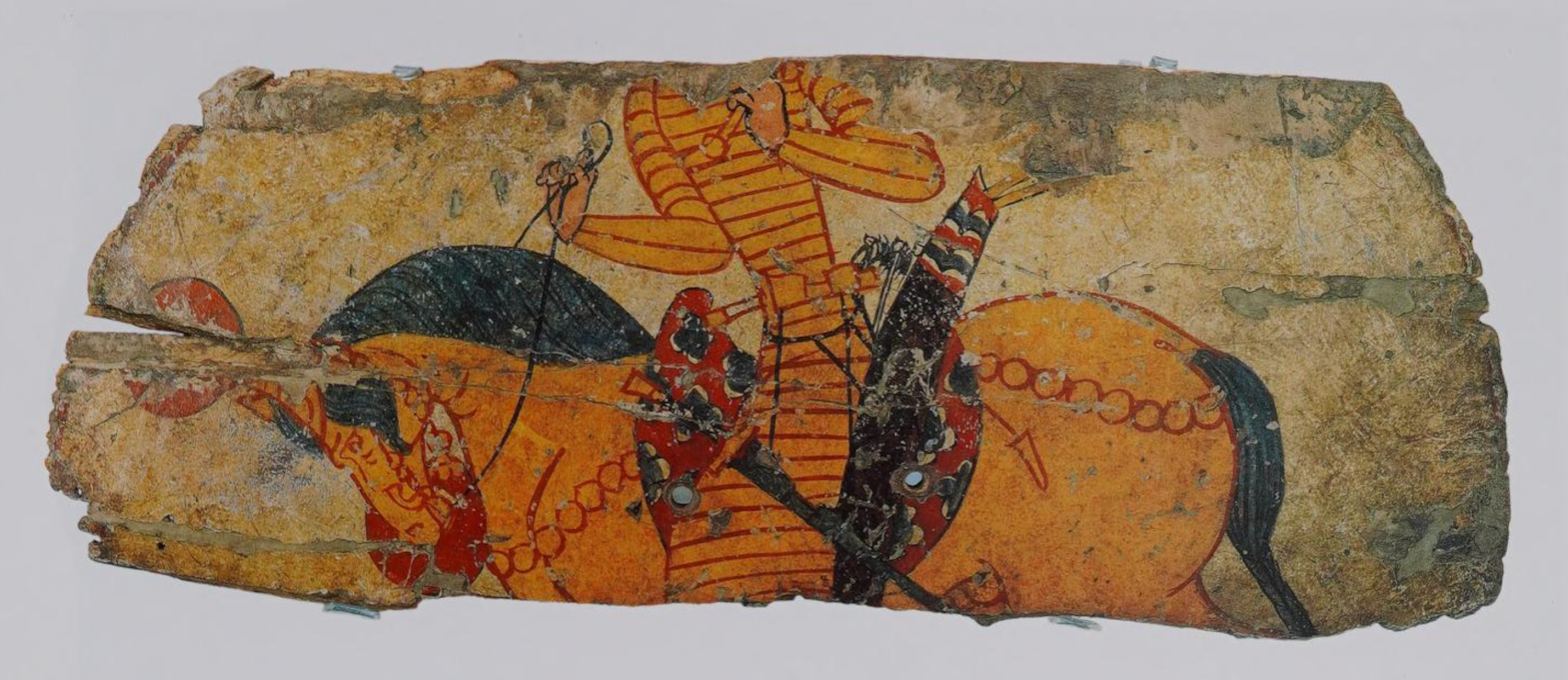
Painted parchement, Sogdia, early 8th century. Found in the castle of Prince Dewastich on Mount Mugh.

== Religion ==
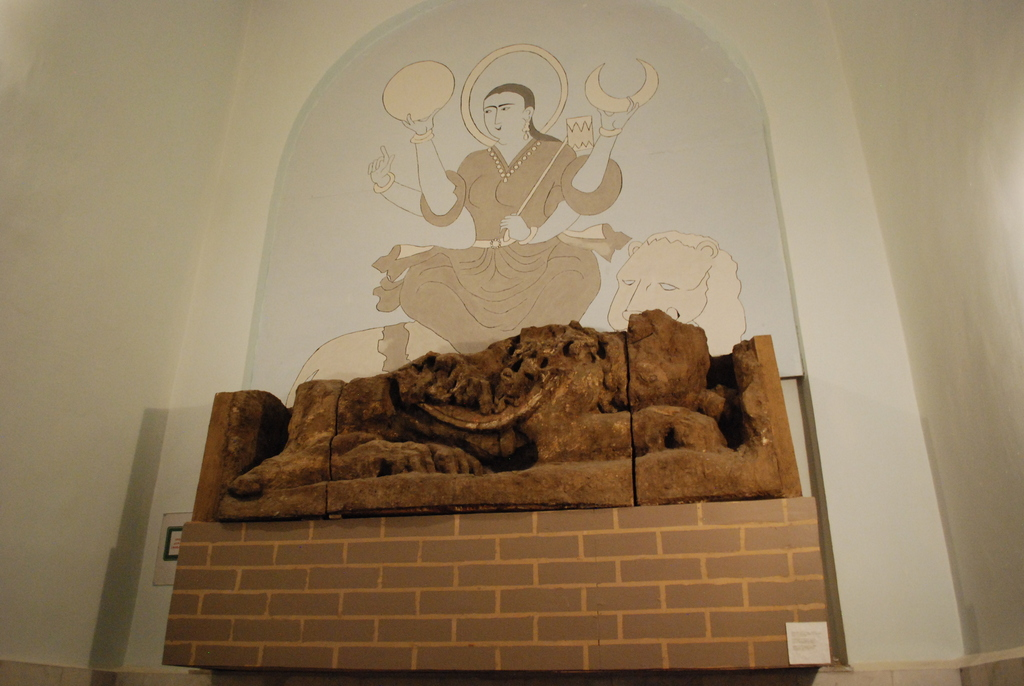
Fragments of Goddess Nanaya with a lion. Penjikent, 6-8th century CE. National Museum of Antiquities of Tajikistan.

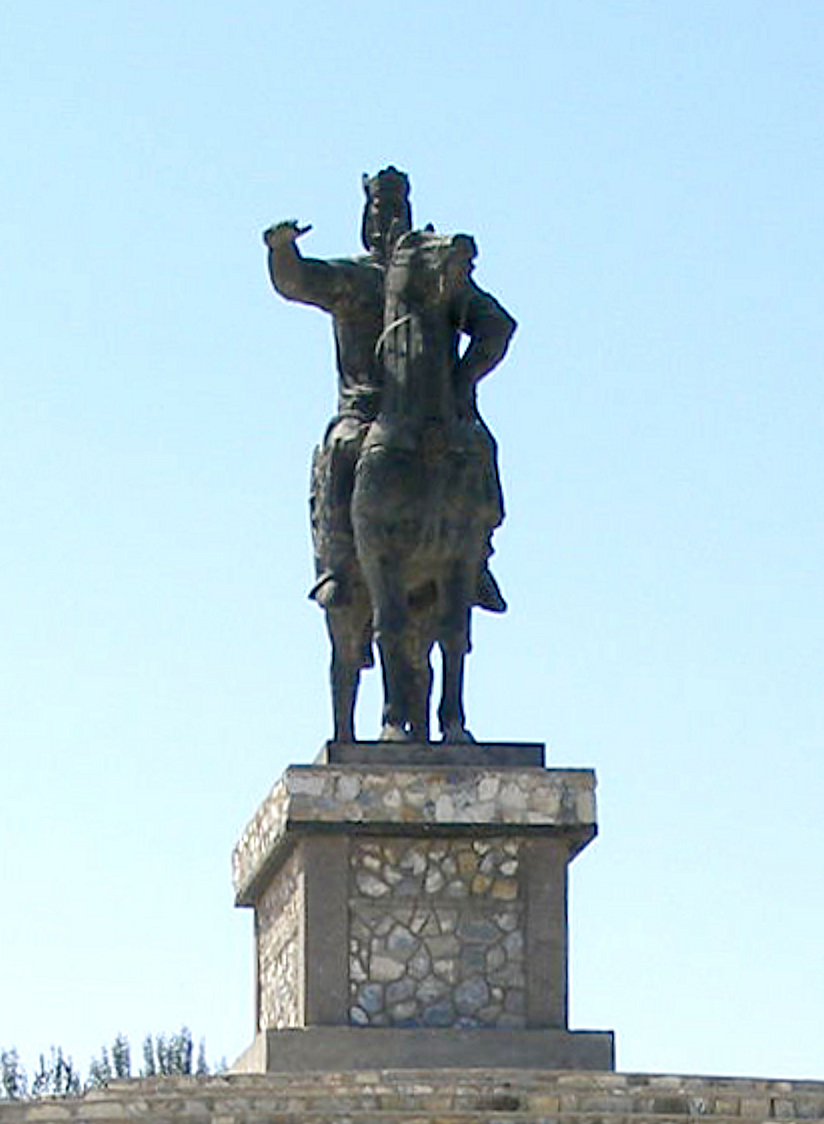
Monument to Devashtich in Penjikent, Tajikistan.

Although Buddhism and Manichaeism had spread around Sogdia, Divashtich, including the majority of his subjects, were practicing Zoroastrianism, which was, however, different from the one practiced in the Iranian plateau. The Zoroastrianism worshipped by Divashtich and his subjects, also known as "Sogdian Zoroastrianism", was a different Zoroastrian sect which had received influence from different religions. Even ancient Mesopotamian religions had influenced the Zoroastrian sect, and gods such as Nanaya were worshipped by the Sogdians.

== Descendants ==
Divashtich's son Tarkhun (not to be confused with the Sogdian ruler Tarkhun) was taken as a prisoner of war in Iraq. His family lived there for three generations; in the fourth generation, a member of the family named Mikal ibn Abd al-Wahid, settled in Khorasan at the beginning of the 9th century, where his descendants continued to live, marking the start of the prominent Mikalid family, which served various dynasties of Khorasan.

== Sources ==
- Marshak, Boris (1994). "DĒWĀŠTĪČ". In Yarshater, Ehsan (ed.). Encyclopædia Iranica. Vol. VII/3: Dehqān I–Deylam, John of. London and New York: Routledge & Kegan Paul. pp. 334–335. ISBN 978-1-56859-021-9.
- Litvinsky, B. A.; Dani, Ahmad Hasan (1996). History of Civilizations of Central Asia: The crossroads of civilizations, A.D. 250 to 750. UNESCO. pp. 1–569. ISBN 9789231032110.
- Bulliet, R. W. (1984). "ĀL-E MĪKĀL". In Yarshater, Ehsan (ed.). Encyclopædia Iranica. Vol. I/7: Ahriman–Alafrank. London and New York: Routledge & Kegan Paul. p. 764. ISBN 978-0-71009-096-6.
- C.E., Bosworth (1993). "Mīkālīs". In Bosworth, C. E.; van Donzel, E.; Heinrichs, W. P. & Pellat, Ch. (eds.). The Encyclopaedia of Islam, Second Edition. Volume VII: Mif–Naz. Leiden: E. J. Brill. ISBN 978-90-04-09419-2.
- Marshak, Boris (2002). "PANJIKANT". In Yarshater, Ehsan (ed.). Encyclopædia Iranica (Online ed.). Encyclopædia Iranica Foundation.
- Hansen, Valerie (2012). The Silk Road. Oxford University Press. pp. 1–304. ISBN 9780195159318. "Diwashini."
- Yakubovich, Ilya (2002). "Mugh 1.I. Revisited". Studia Iranica. 31 (2): 231–253. doi:10.2143/SI.31.2.270.

Preceded by Chukin Chur Bilga	Ruler of Panjikant; 706–722	Umayyad conquest
