= Atalıq =

Tutors of a khan's children

Atalıq were tutors of a khan's children in the Golden Horde and later other Tatar khanates. In some cases they could rule regions or command units if the khan was a minor.
