= Battle of Samarkand (1613) =

- Part of Kazakh–Uzbek Wars
Date	1613
Location	Samarkand, Uzbekistan
Result	Kazakh Victory

Belligerents
Kazakh Khanate	Khanate of Bukhara

Commanders and leaders
(Kazakh Khanate) Esim Khan	(Khanate of Bukhara) Imamkuli Khan

Battle of Samarkand — the battle of 1613 between the Kazakh Khanate and the Bukhara Khanate in the Samarkand region.

In 1613, the Kazakhs once again captured the city and advanced into the Samarkand region. Imam-kuli-khan crossed paths with them, who despite the support of his brother Nadir-Muhammad-sultan, the ruler of Balkh, was defeated and returned to the capital in a pitiful state. The return of the eastern regions of the state proved to be a challenging task, so Imam-kuli-khan decided to help bring a reliable ally from among the Kazakh sultans to power. The opportunity for this soon arose.
