= Tarkhun =

8th-century ruler of Samarkand

- King of Samarkand
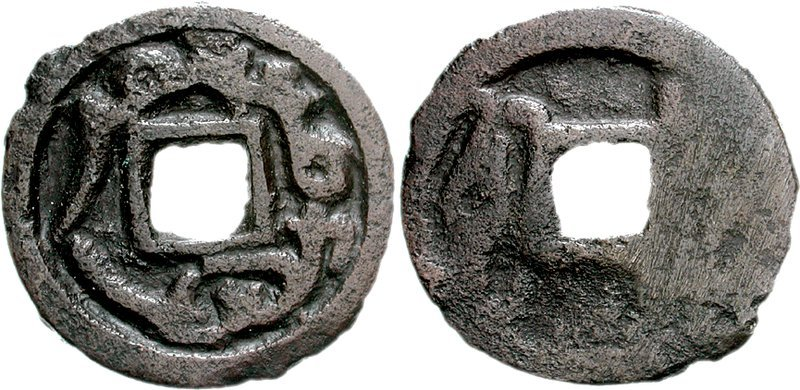
- Coin of Tarkhun.
- Reign: 700–710
- Predecessor: Mastich-Unash
- Successor: Gurak
- Born: Samarkand, Sogdia
- Dynasty: Ikhshids
- Religion: Zoroastrianism

Tarkhun (Chinese: 突昏 tū-hūn, died 710) was a Sogdian ruler (Sogdian: əxšēδ) of Samarkand from somewhere 705–707 to 710. After receiving the news of the capture of Bukhara by the Umayyad general Qutayba ibn Muslim in 709, Tarkhun sent envoys to the latter and acknowledged the authority of the Umayyad Caliphate. His two sons had to be kept at the Umayyad court as hostages.

However, one year later, Tarkhun was overthrown by a local rebellion because of his pro-Muslim policy, and was succeeded by another Sogdian prince named Gurak, who had Tarkhun imprisoned. Tarkhun shortly after committed suicide. His two sons, however, managed to flee to the court of another Sogdian ruler named Divashtich at Panjikant, where they were treated honorably.

The accession of Tarkhun is reported in the Chinese chronicles of the Tang Huiyao: "During the years of Shenlong (705-707), Ninieshishi [Mastich-Unash (698-700)] died. And his son Tarkhun was put on the throne". It is also reported in the New Book of Tang: "After his death Mastich-Unash succeeded him. After the death of Mastich-Unash, the people chose Tarkhun as King".

== Sources ==
- Al-Tabari, Abu Ja'far Muhammad ibn Jarir. The History of al-Tabari. Ed. Ehsan Yar-Shater. 40 vols. Albany, NY: State University of New York Press, 1985–2007.
- Gibb, H. A. R. (1923). The Arab Conquests in Central Asia. The Royal Asiatic Society.
- Wellhausen, Julius (1927). The Arab Kingdom and its Fall. Translated by Margaret Graham Weir. Calcutta: University of Calcutta. OCLC 752790641.
- Wang Pu, Institutional History of Tang唐会要, volume 99.

Preceded by Mastich-Unash	Ikhshid of Samarkand; 700–710	Succeeded by Gurak
