= Capture of Samarkand (1740) =

18th century military conflict

Battle of Samarkand (1740)
- Part of Nader Shah's Central Asian campaign and Campaigns of Nader Shah
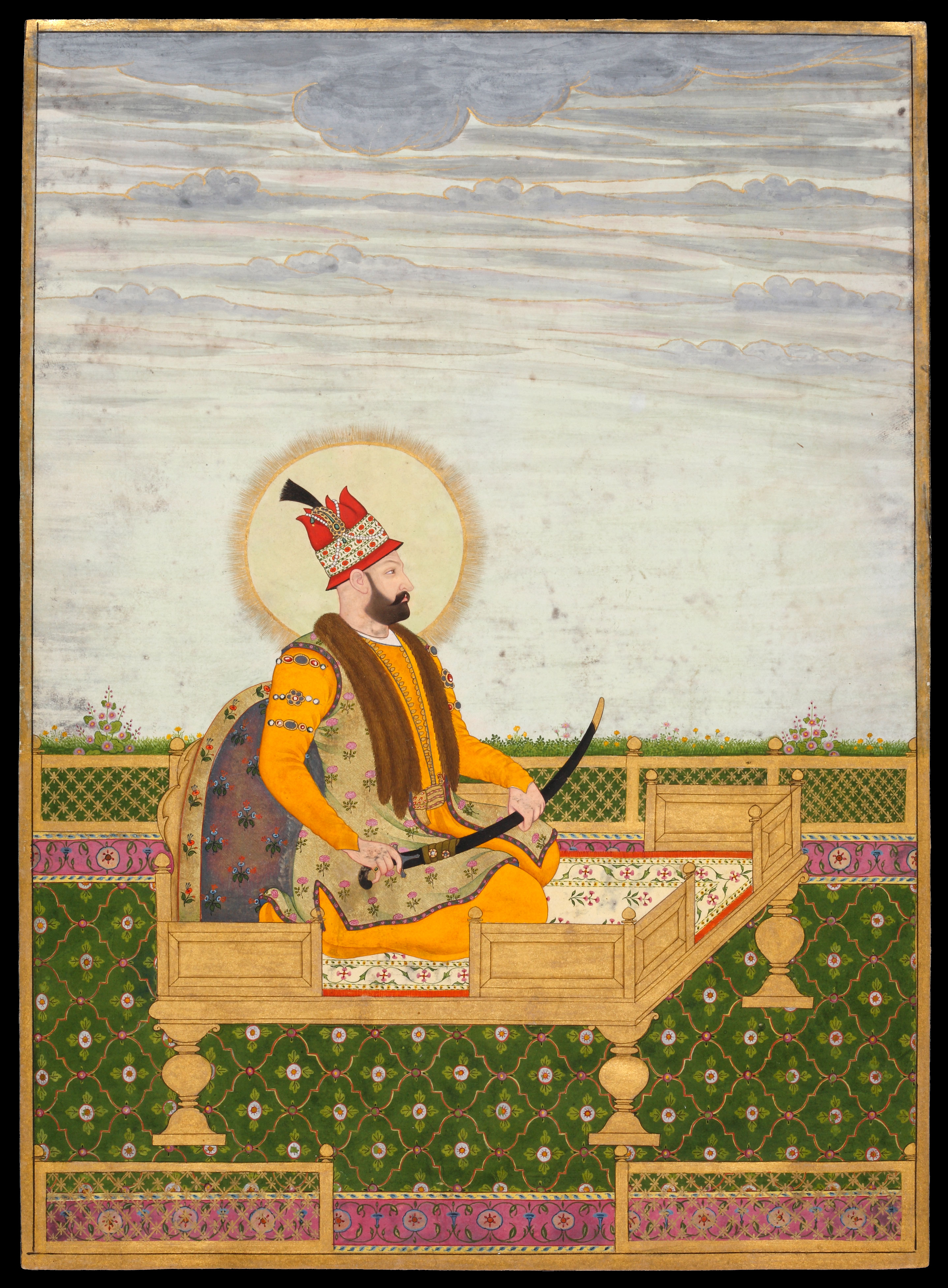
- Portrait of Nadir Shah Afshar, c. 1740–1750
| Date | 1740 |
| Location | Samarkand |
| Result | Persian victory |
| Territorial changes | Persian capture of Samarkand |

Belligerents
| Afsharid Iran | Khanate of Bukhara |

Commanders and leaders
| (Afsharid Iran) Nader Shah Afshar | (Khanate of Bukhara) Abu al-Fayz Khan (Khanate of Bukhara) Abu Salam Khan † |

Nader Shah, the founder of Afsharid dynasty, captured Samarkand (Persian: فتح سمرقند), one of the main political and economic centres of the region, during his Central Asian campaign in 1740. For Nader Shah, who was an admirer of Amir Timur, Samarkand had a symbolic meaning. Nader Shah entered Samarkand almost unopposed. According to legend, Nader Shah brought the double doors of the Bibi-Khanym Mosque made of gold, silver, precious stones, jewelry and other precious metals, located in Samarkand, as well as a number of architects, artists, and scientists, to the center of the Afsharid Empire.

== Background ==
The preparations of the campaign that led to the capture of Samarkand initiated in the 1730s. At this time, Nader Shah was on the Indian campaign, and his successor, prince Reza Qoli Mirza Afshar, had managed to win several brilliant victories over the states of Central Asia. Razagulu's capture of Khiva angered Ilbars Khan, the Khan of Khiva, who threatened to launch a counterattack. Since Nader himself was far away, he ordered his son to end hostilities. His plan was to carry out more successful operations under his command after his return.

After the annexation of Khiva, Nader had Ilbars executed and replaced him with Abulfaz Khan. Nader thought he would be more faithful. As a result of this campaign, a victory was won over Central Asia that almost none of the states which existed in the region, including the Safavids, could achieve.

=== The start of the campaign to Central Asia ===
Nader Shah wanted to conquer Turkestan. As the first step for this, he built a bridge over the Amu Darya. This bridge was convenient for two loaded camels to cross side by side. After the construction of the bridge which took 45 days, fortifications were erected on both sides of the bridge according to the order of Nader. Five thousand soldiers were placed in each fortification. After these preparations, Afsharid army under the command of Nader Shah began to march towards Bukhara, and despite the fact that the army was exhausted, it quickly launched attacks.

From the camp on the shore of Amu Darya, Nader Shah sent an army of eight thousand people to Reza Qoli Mirza to capture the city of Charjou. Another commander, Ali Qoli Khan, was instructed to advance towards the cities located in the east of the river and capture unsubordinated places. By the time Reza Qoli Mirza approached Charjou, the city had long been left. The population of the city heard about the approach of Afsharid army, left the city and went to Khwarazm. Ali Qoli Khan also subdued the necessary places without facing strong resistance.

The governor of Bukhara, Abulfaz Khan, was afraid of the strength of Nader's army and sent the vizier Bi Ataliq to Nader's camp. Nader, who welcomed the ambassador with respect, welcomed his peace offer, but rejected Abulfaz Khan's offer to meet in Garagul. Nadir said that if Abulfaz Khan wanted peace, he should have come to this camp himself, and this request was accepted. But at this time, Abulfaz Khan received the news that an army of 100,000 people gathered from different tribes was ready to help him. He thought about the possibility of defeating Nader with this army and increasing his influence in the region, and he refused to negotiate with Nader about peace. Many nobles and army chiefs of Turkestan also defended Abulfaz Khan's decision to go to war with Nader. At the end, Abulfaz Khan prepared his armies and left Bukhara. He wanted to meet Nader in the precinct called Islam, which is located two miles from Bukhara. After Nader saw that there was no news from Abulfaz Khan, he learned what was happening through his scouts and started discussions with his generals.

To ensure the security of the troops, the duty of guard was assigned to a group of 3,000 under the leadership of Haji Khan Kurd and Gasim Bay Afshar. This guard unit came face to face with Abulfaz Khan's guard unit near Qatartut and a battle took place between them. Nader's troops won this heavy battle.

=== Capture of Bukhara ===
Nader Shah's artillery inflicted heavy losses on Abulfaz Khan's troops. The Uzbek and Turkmen forces met for the first time with cannons, which influenced to the confusion among them. In particular, the forces in the center collided. However, Abulfaz Khan's troops did not retreat. When they saw that it was impossible to advance from the center, they continued the attack from the flanks, from the directions where the cannons did not work. In any case, the mutual efforts of the opposing sides created the basis for the intensification of close combat. Despite all the existing tension, Nader Shah managed to direct the main strike force of his troops to the positions where Abulfaz Khan was standing. This destroyed the fighting power of Turkestan troops. Seeing the disintegration of the general ranks, the general of Agili left the battlefield and turned back. When this happened, Abulfaz Khan was sure that he would not be able to win and retreated to the Bukhara fortress.

Realizing that he would not be able to win against Nader, Abulfaz Khan again sent a messenger and declared that he agreed to peace. Nader Shah accepted this reconciliation proposal and even sent valuable gifts to Abulfaz Khan through the messengers who came to him. After hearing the news brought by Doctor Ataliq, Abulfaz Khan also sent valuable gifts to Nader Shah. After peace was gained with Abulfaz Khan, Nader Shah moved towards Bukhara. In order not to endanger the population of Bukhara, Nader Shah entrusted the issue of supplying the troops to Hakim Ataliq. During Nader Shah's stay in Bukhara, Hakim Ataliq had to provide food for his troops. The commanders of the troops were instructed that the fighters should not disturb the local population regarding the issues of food and catering. Nader Shah also instructed the commanders to keep discipline among the troops under control. According to Nader's order, those who touched the local population and violated the discipline should be arrested and executed. After entering Bukhara, a sermon was read in the name of Nader Shah and a coin was minted. At that time, the capture of the city of Samarkand was ahead.

== Capture of Samarkand ==
Nader Shah's army attacked Samarkand in 1740. At that time, the Khanate of Bukhara was already dependent on the state of Nader Shah. According to Nader Shah, who was an admirer of Amir Timur, Samarkand had a symbolic meaning. Nader Shah entered Samarkand almost unopposed, and from there prepared to march on Ilbars Khan, who was still a threat to his state.

Nader Shah, who easily captured Samarkand, received information that an army consisting of 20,000 soldiers of Samarkand, Bukhara and Kokand forces was approaching him. An army was sent against them under the leadership of Lutfali Khan, and although the rebels learned about this and began to retreat, Lutfali Khan managed to catch up with them and defeated their army.

According to legend, Nader Shah brought the double doors of the Bibi-Khanym Mosque made of gold, silver, precious stones, jewelry and other precious metals, located in Samarkand, as well as a number of architects, artists, and scientists, to the center of the Afshar Empire.

== See also ==
- Nader Shah's Central Asian campaign
- Campaigns of Nader Shah

== Literature ==
- Süleymanov, Mehman (2010). Nadir şah. ISBN 978-600-91345-8-8.
- Soucek, Svat (2000), A History of Inner Asia, Oxford: Oxford University Press
