= Gurak =

Medieval Sogdian ruler

- King of Samarkand
- Reign: 710 — 737 or 738
- Predecessor: Tarkhun
- Successor: Turgar
- Dynasty: Ikhshids of Sogdia
- Religion: Zoroastrianism

Gurak or Ghurak (Chinese: 乌勒伽; pinyin: wūlèjiā) was a medieval Sogdian ruler in Central Asia during the period of the Muslim conquest of Transoxiana.

== Rule ==
In 710, Gurak was installed as king (Sogdian: ikhshid) of Samarkand after the populace overthrew his predecessor, Tarkhun, due to his pro-Muslim stance. The Umayyad governor, Qutayba ibn Muslim, campaigned against Samarkand but in the end confirmed Gurak as its ruler.

Gurak was a cautious and intelligent ruler, and managed, through shifting alliance between the Muslims and the Turgesh, to remain on his throne. Some time after the Muslim Pyrrhic victory Battle of the Defile in 731, he managed to recover his capital, Samarkand, and achieve a quasi-independence which he maintained until his death in 737 or 738.

Following his death, Gurak's realm was divided among his relatives (known from Chinese sources): his son, Turgar (Chinese: Tu-ho), formerly prince of Kabudhan, received Samarkand. Me-chu'o became king of Mayamurgh. Ko-lopu-lo, who became king of Ishtikhan in 742, may perhaps be identified with Gurak's brother Afarun.

Preceded by Tarkhun	Ruler of Samarkand; 710–738	Succeeded by Turgar

== Sources ==
- Dickens, Mark (2018). "Ghurak". In Nicholson, Oliver (ed.). The Oxford Dictionary of Late Antiquity. Oxford: Oxford University Press. p. 664. ISBN 978-0-19-866277-8.
- Gibb, H. A. R. (1923). The Arab Conquests in Central Asia. London: The Royal Asiatic Society.
- Wellhausen, Julius (1927). The Arab Kingdom and Its Fall. Translated by Margaret Graham Weir. Calcutta: University of Calcutta.
