= Ferghana Kingdom =

Ancient Iranian dynasty

Principality of Farghana
- before 712–819
- Map of Khurasan, Transoxiana and Tokharistan
- Status: Autonomous principality, at times client of the Umayyads and the Turgesh or Tang dynasty
- Capital: Akhsikath
- Common languages: Sogdian
- Government: Monarchy
- Ikhshid
- Historical era: Middle Ages
  - Established: before 712
  - Samanid conquest: 819
Succeeded by
Samanid Empire

The Principality of Farghana (also spelled Ferghana, Fergana, and Fargana) was a local Iranian dynasty of Sogdian origin, which ruled the Farghana region from an unknown date to 819. The rulers of the region were known by their titles of "ikhshid" and "dehqan". The capital of the principality was Akhsikath.

== History ==
The principality of Farghana was under Western Turk rule until it was destroyed by Tang China in 657 and after that under the Anxi Protectorate. It was conquered from Majusis by the Umayyad Arab general Qutayba ibn Muslim during the Muslim conquest of Transoxiana. Farghana, along with Khujand, was shortly raided after Qutayba's victory over Gurak.

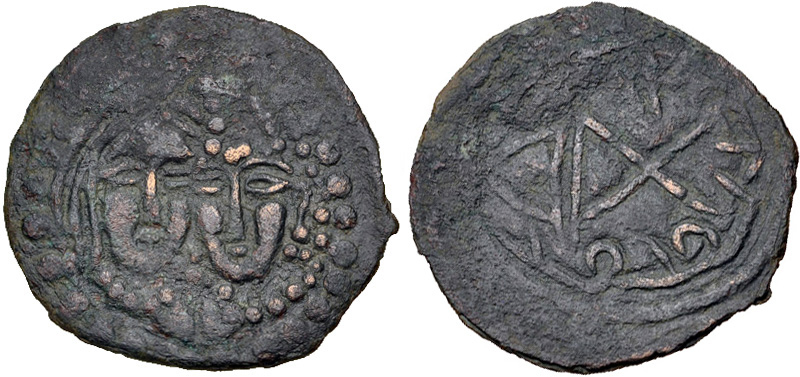
Pre-muslim coinage of Ferghana.

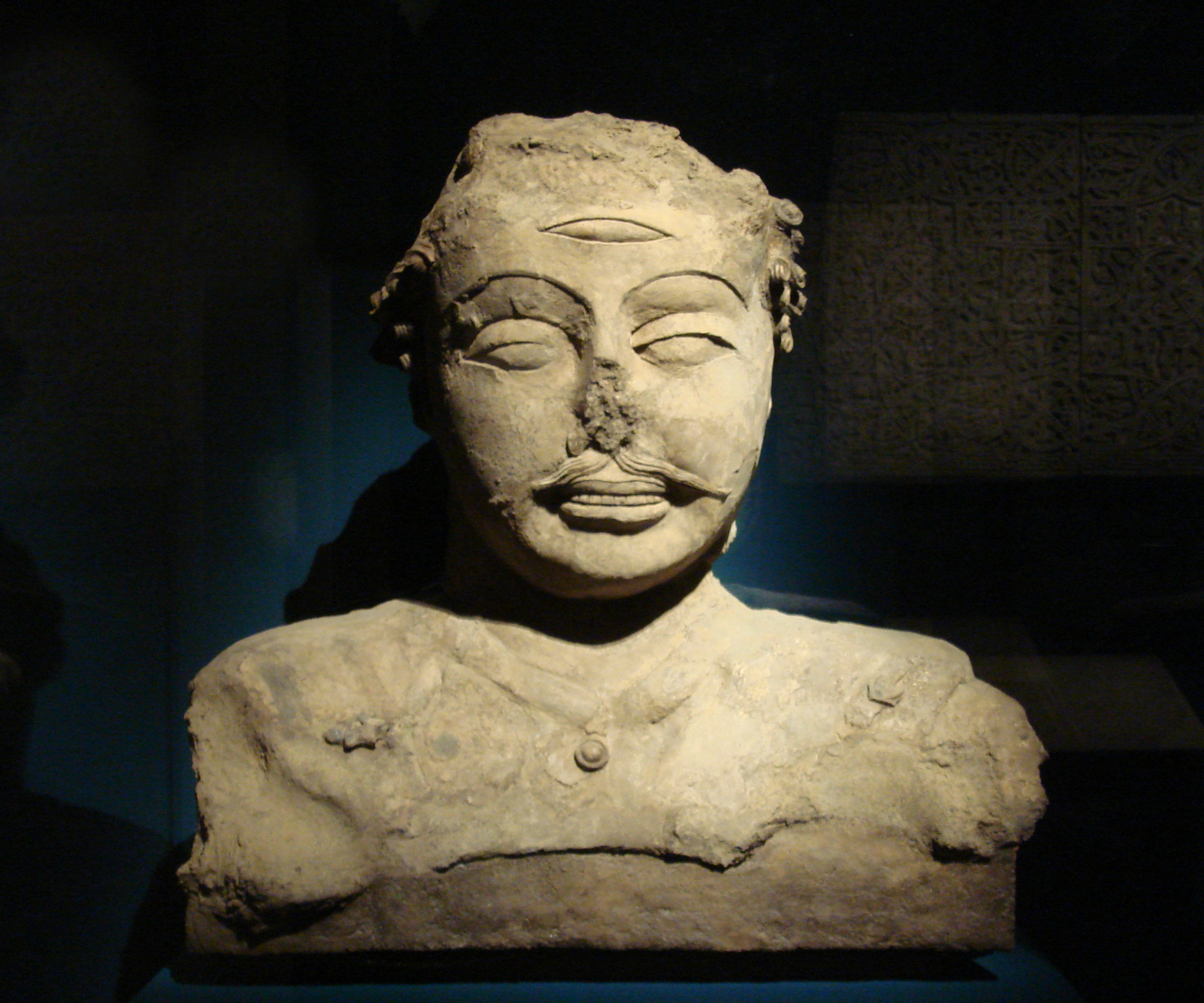
Divinity Weshparkar, 7th century, Quva (Ferghana), Uzbekistan.

In 715, Qutayba completely subdued Farghana, and made it a vassal state of the Umayyad Caliphate. During the reign of the Umayyad caliph Sulayman ibn Abd al-Malik (r. 715–717), the ikhshid ("king") of Farghana revolted against Umayyad authority, but was shortly defeated and killed. He was buried in Andijan. After the death of Qutayba (also in 715), Ferghana was taken back by Chinese general Zhang Xiaosong (張孝嵩).

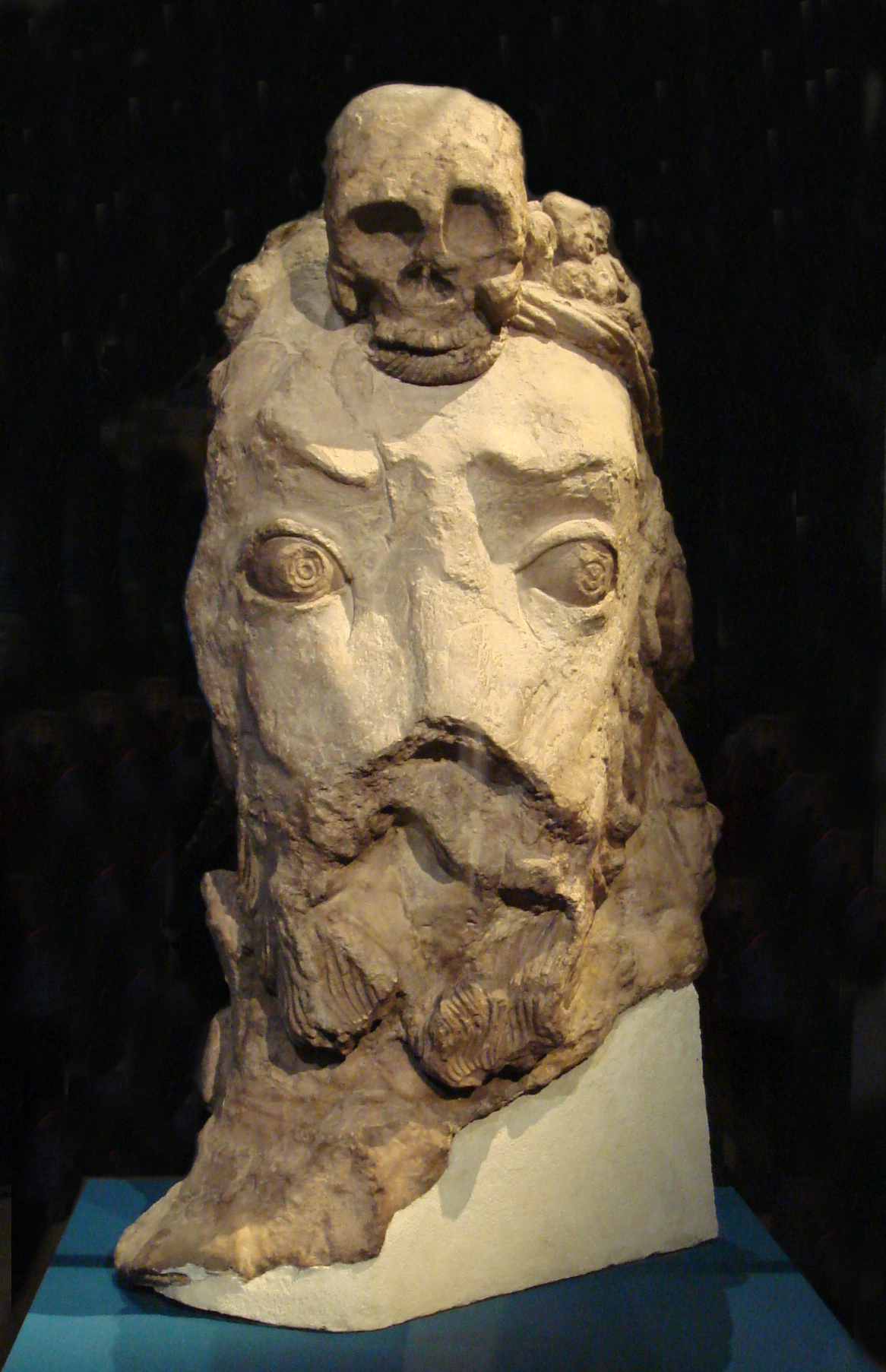
Head of a demon, 7th century, Buddhist temple of Quva (Ferghana), Uzbekistan.

In cities such as Panjikant and Pai, the Sogdians revolted; the most dangerous being the rebellion of 720-722 under Divashtich and Karzanj, who gained the support of the ikhshid of Ferghana, known as at-Tar (also spelled Alutar). At-tar promised to give them protection in case their rebellion turned into a failure. While the army of Karzanj was staying at Khujand, at-Tar betrayed him, and told the Umayyad general Sa'id ibn Amr al-Harashi where Karzanj and his army was stationing. Al-Harashi quickly marched towards Khujand, where he defeated the army of Karzanj, brutally massacring over 3,000 Sogdian inhabitants in the city. He then marched towards Zarafshan, where he defeated and captured Divashtich, who was later executed. Sa'id thus managed to restore Umayyad control over Transoxiana, except Ferghana.

In 723, a Umayyad army under Muslim ibn Sa'id al-Kilabi invaded Ferghana, and devastated the countryside. However, an army under the Turgesh khagan Suluk came to the rescue for their Ferghanian allies, and won a crushing victory over the Arabs in the so-called "Day of Thirst". In 726, Farghana became divided between two ikhshids, one ruling in the north and as a vassal of the Turgesh. In 729, an ikhshid of Farghana aided the Turgesh during the Siege of Kamarja, and two years later the Turgesh was aided by Ferghana during the Battle of the Defile. In 739, a Turk named Arslan Dehqan, conquered Ferghana. However, at the same time Ferghana was invaded by the Umayyad general Muhammad ibn Khalid Azdi. Nevertheless, the ikhshids of Ferghana are still mentioned in sources. Ferghana was in 740 ravaged by another Umayyad general named Nasr ibn Sayyar. Chinese sources, however, recorded that Arslan Dehqan assisted the Tang in defeating the Turgesh Khagan Kut Chor in 739, married a Tang princess in 744, and received a granted last name Dou from Emperor Xuanzong's mother. In 750, the Umayyad Caliphate fell, and was replaced by the Abbasid Caliphate. Farghana joined the Chinese side in the battle of Talas in 751. Nevertheless, Farghana remained out of Arab control from 715 until late 700s.

=== Samanids ===
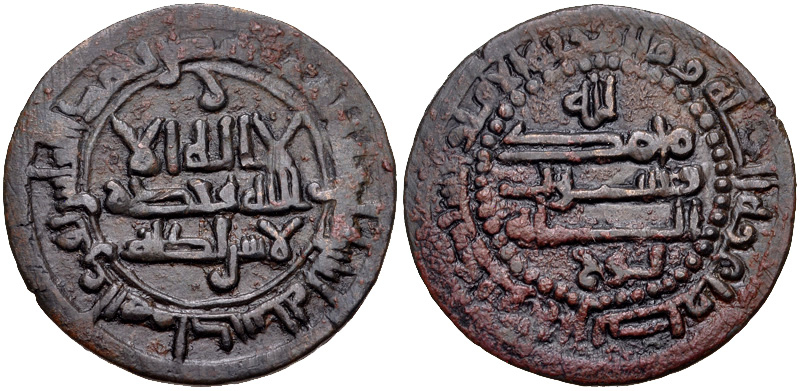
Coinage of Malik ibn Shakartegin (Circa AH 312-344/ 924-955 CE), a Samanid ruler of Akhsikath. Ferghana mint, dated AH 382 (AD 992-3).

In 819, the governor of Khurasan, Ghassan ibn 'Abbad, appointed the Samanid prince Ahmad ibn Asad as the ruler of Farghana, thus marking the end of the ancient dynasty which ruled Farghana.

== See also ==
- Principality of Khuttal
- Principality of Chaghaniyan
- Bukhar Khudahs
- Principality of Ushrusana

== Sources ==
- Hansen, Valerie (2012). The Silk Road. Oxford University Press. pp. 1–304. ISBN 9780195159318. "Diwashini."
- Bosworth, C. Edmund (1999). "FARḠĀNA". Encyclopaedia Iranica. London et al.: C. Edmund Bosworth.
- Gibb, H. A. R. (1923). The Arab Conquests in Central Asia. London: The Royal Asiatic Society. OCLC 685253133.
- Litvinsky, B. A.; Dani, Ahmad Hasan (1996). History of Civilizations of Central Asia: The crossroads of civilizations, A.D. 250 to 750. UNESCO. pp. 1–569. ISBN 9789231032110.
- Blankinship, Khalid Yahya (1994). The End of the Jihâd State: The Reign of Hishām ibn ʻAbd al-Malik and the Collapse of the Umayyads. Albany, NY: State University of New York Press. ISBN 978-0-7914-1827-7.
