= Boris Marshak =

Russian archeologist (1933–2006)

- Борис Маршак
- Born: 9 July 1933; Luga, Russian SFSR, Soviet Union
- Died: 28 July 2006 (aged 73); Panjakent, Tajikistan
- Occupation: Archeologist
- Spouse: Valentina I. Raspopova

Academic background
- Education: Moscow State University

Academic work
- Institutions: Hermitage Museum
- Main interests: Sogdia

Boris Ilich Marshak (Russian: Борис Ильич Маршак; 9 July 1933 – 28 July 2006) was a Russian archeologist who spent more than fifty years excavating the Sogdian ruins at Panjakent, Tajikistan.

== Biography ==
Boris Ilich Marshak was born in Luga, Leningrad Oblast, Russian SFSR 9 July 1933. He received a specialist degree in archeology from Moscow University in 1956, his Candidate of Sciences degree in archeology from the Institute of Archaeology, Leningrad, in 1965 and a doctorate of historical sciences from Moscow University in 1982.

Marshak began his work at the Sogdian ruins at Panjakent, which date from the 5th-8th century, in 1954. He became director of the archeological expedition in 1978, a position he held until his death. Marshak was a leading authority on the history of Panjakent, the archeology and art history of Central Asia, and medieval eastern silverware. In 1979 he became head of the Department of Central Asia and Caucasus at the Hermitage Museum, in Leningrad.

After the fall of the Soviet Union in 1991, Marshak's job became significantly more difficult. Funding for fieldwork dried up and he instantly became a foreigner in the new state of Tajikistan at a time when ethnic Russians were fleeing Central Asia en masse. Marshak stayed on as director of the excavation of the Panjakent ruins, even during the years of civil war in Tajikistan from 1992 to 1997, while other archeological sites in the former Soviet Union were plundered by looters. Through close cooperation with the government of Tajikistan, Marshak ensured protection and continued excavation of the Panjakent site. In the 1990s and first decade of the 21st century Marshak received numerous honorariums from international organizations and taught, lectured and conducted fellowships in Italy, the United States, Austria and elsewhere.

Marshak died 28 July 2006 on the site of the Panjakent ruins. He was buried at the site, as requested in his will. His wife, the noted archeologist and Marshak's frequent professional collaborator, Valentina I. Raspopova, later resumed her excavation work at the site.

== Honorary awards and memberships ==
- 2002 Foreign associate Member of the Academie des Inscriptions et Belles-Lettres, (Institut de France).
- 1999 Order of Friendship, Tajikistan.
- 1998 Foreign Corresponding Member of the Academie des Inscriptions et Belles-Lettres (Institut de France).
- 1995 Honorary Member of the Archaeological Institute of America.
- 1991 Honorary Fellow of the Royal Asiatic Society of the Great Britain and Ireland.
- 1990 Corresponding Member of IsMEO (Institute of the Middle and Far East, Rome).
- 1989 Prix Ghirshman de L'Academie (Academie des Inscriptions et Belles-Lettres, Institut de France).
- Ferdousi premium – London.
- Order of Honor – Russia.

== Selected works ==
Publications authored or edited by Marshak are listed by publishers under several variants of his name. These include: Boris Ilich Marshak, B. I. Marshak, and other combinations of names and initials. In addition, his family name is sometimes rendered in Roman script as Maršak, while his patronymic is sometimes transliterated, Il'ich.

=== Books ===
- Legends, Tales and Fables in the Art of Sogdiana. Appendix by Vladimir A. Livšic. New York: Bibliotheca Persica Press. 2002. ISBN 9780933273610.
- [Coauthored with]: Kossolapov, A. J.; —— (1999). Stennaia zhivopis' Srednei in Tsentral'noi Azii | Murals along the Silk Road: Combined Art-Historical and Laboratory Study (in Russian and English). St Petersburg: Formika. ISBN 9785775400149. OCLC 1391726991.
- [Coauthored with]: Zalesskaja, V. N.; Lvova, Z.; ——; Solokova, I. V. (1997). Сокровища Хана Кубрата Перещепинский клад (Sokrovishcha Khana Kubrata Pereshepinskii Klad) [The Treasures of Khan Kubrat: The Pereshchepino Hoard]. Sankt-Peterburg: Slavija. ISBN 9785886540567.
  - Edited with: Kramarovsky, M., eds. (1996). Sokrovishcha Priob'iya [Treasures from the Ob' Basin]. St. Petersburg: Formika. (Exhibition Catalogue). St. Petersburg.
  - Authored in this work —
  - • "Introduction"; and twenty-four other individual entries.
- Silberschäte des Orients: Metallkunst des 3-13. Jahrhunderts und ihre Kontinuität [Silverwork of the Orient: Metal art from the 3rd to 13th centuries and its continuity] (in German). Leipzig: Seemann. 1986.
- Sogdiǐskoe serebro: Ocherki po vostochnoǐ torevtike [Sogdian Silver: An Essay on Oriental Toreutics] (in Russian). Moscow: Nauka. 1971. (Note: Toreutics is a term for types of fine, artistic, metalworking.)

=== Chapters in edited works ===
- "The art of glass along the Silk Road". China: Dawn of a golden age, 200–750 AD. New York; New Haven: The Metropolitan Museum of Art; Yale University Press. 2004. ISBN 1588391264. OCLC 1365879372. Catalog of an exhibition held at the Metropolitan Museum of Art, New York, 12 October 2004 – 23 January 2005.
- "Sogd". In Istoriia tadzhikskogo naroda [History of the Tajik People]. Dushanbe. 2000.
- "Sogd V-VIII w. Ideologiia po pamiatnikam isskustva". In Brykina, G., ed. (1999) Arkheologija. Srednjaja Azija i Dal'nii Vostok v epokhu srednevekov'ia. Srednjaja Azija v rannem srednevekov'e. Moscow: [Nauka]. pp. 175–191.
- In Aoyagi, Masanori; Mori, Yōko; Wakakuwa, Midori, eds. (1999). 世界美術大全集 (Sekai bijutsu daizenshū) [New history of world art] (in Japanese). Vol. 15 (Western ed.). Tōkyō: Shōgakkan. Chapters —
  - "Sogdian Art". pp. 207–218
  - "Shogakukan". pp. 386–395
- "Sughd". In History of Civilization of Central Asia. Vol. III. UNESCO Publishing. 1996. pp. 233–258.
- "Iskusstvo Sogda". In 'Tsentral'naia Aziia'. Novye Pamiatniki pis'mennosti i iskusstva. Moscow. 1987. pp. 233–248.
- "Oriental Analogien zu den Bauwerken von Typus des eingeschriebenen Kreuzes: Pendzikent und Bamian, V-VII Jh". In B. Brentjes, ed., Probleme der Architektur des Orients Halle (Saale). 1983. pp. 53–64. In German.
- [Coauthored with]: Belenitskii, A. M.; —— (1981). "Part I: The Paintings of Sogdiana". In Guitty Azarpay (ed.). Sogdian Painting: The Pictorial Epic in Oriental Art. Berkeley: University of California Press. pp. 11–77.
- [Coauthored with]: Belenitskii, A. M.; ——; Raspopova, V. I. (1979). "Sotsial'naya struktura naseleniya drevnego Pendzhikenta". In B. Gafurov; G. F. Girs; E. A. Davidovich (eds.). Tovarno-denezhnye otnosheniya na Blizhnem i Srednem Vostoke v eµpokhu srednevekov'ya (in Russian). pp. 19–26.
- [Coauthored with]: Belenitskii, A. M.; —— (1978). "Drevneîshee izobrazhenie osadnoî mashiny v Sredneî Azii" [The oldest representation of a siege engine in Central Asia]. In V. G. Lukonin (ed.). Kul'tura Vostoka: Drevnost' i rannee serdnevekov'e [Culture of the East: Antiquity and early Middle Ages] (in Russian). Leningrad: Izdatel'svto Avrora. pp. 215–221.

=== Journal articles ===
- "Une peinture kouchane sur toile". Académie des Inscriptions & Belles-lettres, Comptes rendus des séances de l'année 2006 avril-juin. Paris 2006. pp. 947–963.
- "The Archaeology of Sogdiana". The Silk Road, 1/2. December 2003. pp. 3–8
- "A Sogdian Silver Bowl from the Freer Gallery of Art". Ars Orientalis XXIX, 1999.
- "L'Art Sogdien (IV^{e}–IX^{e} siecle)". Les Arts de 1' Asie Centrale. Paris. 1999. pp. 114–163.
- "The Tiger, Raised from the Dead: Two Murals from Panjikent". Bulletin of the Asia Institute. Vol. 10. 1996. pp. 207–217.
- "On the Iconography of Ossuaries from Biya Naiman". Silk Road Art and Archaeology. Kamakura. Vol 4 (6). 1995. pp. 299–321.
- "Le programme iconographique des peintures de la 'Salle des Ambassadeurs' a Afrasiab (Samarkand)". Arts Asiatiques. Vol. XLIX. 1994. pp. 1–20.
- "The Historico-Cultural Significance of the Sogdian Calendar". Iran. Vol. XXX. London. 1992. pp. 145–154.
- "A Hunting Scene from Panjikent". Bulletin of the Asia Institute. Vol. 4. 1990. pp. 77–94.
- "Les fouilles de Pendjikent". [CRAI]. 1990. pp. 286–313.
- "Wall Painting from a House with a Granary. Panjikent, 1st Quarter of the Eighth Century A.D.". Silk Road Art and Archaeology. Vol. 1 1990. pp. 123–176.

Coauthored

- "Le mythe de Nana dans l'art de la Sogdiane". Arts Asiatiques. 1998. pp. 5–18.
- "Worshippers from the Northern Shrine of Temple II, Panjikent". Bulletin of the Asia Institute Vol. 8. 1994. pp. 187–207.
- "Cultes communautaires et cultes prives en Sogdiane". Histoire et cultes de 1'Asie Centrale preislamique. Paris, CNRS. 1991. pp. 187–195.
- "Some Notes on the Tomb of Li-Xian and his Wife under Northern Zhou Dynasty at Guyuan, Ningxia and its Gold-Gilt Silver Ewer with Greek Mythological Scenes Unearthed There". Cultura Antiqua. Vol. 4 (4). 1989. pp. 49–57. In Japanese with English subtitles.
- "Une image sogdienne du dieu-patriarche de I'agriculture". Studia Iranica, Vol. 6: 2. 1987. pp. 193–199.
- "Raskopki gorodishcha drevnego Pendzhikenta". v 1977 g. Arkheologicheskie raboty v Tadzhikistane. Vol. XVII. 1977. Dushanbe. 1984. pp. 187–229.
- "Stennye rospisi, obnaruzhennye v 1970 gody na gorodishche drevnego Pendzhikenta". Soobshcheniya Gosudarstvennogo E˜rmitazha. 36. Leningrad. 1973. pp. 58–64.
- "L'art de Piandjikent aà la lumiére des derniéres fouilles (1958–1968)". Arts Asiatiques. Vol. 23. 1971. pp. 3–39.
