= Ark of Bukhara =

5th-century fortress in Bukhara, Uzbekistan

The Ark Fortress
- Bukhara in Uzbekistan
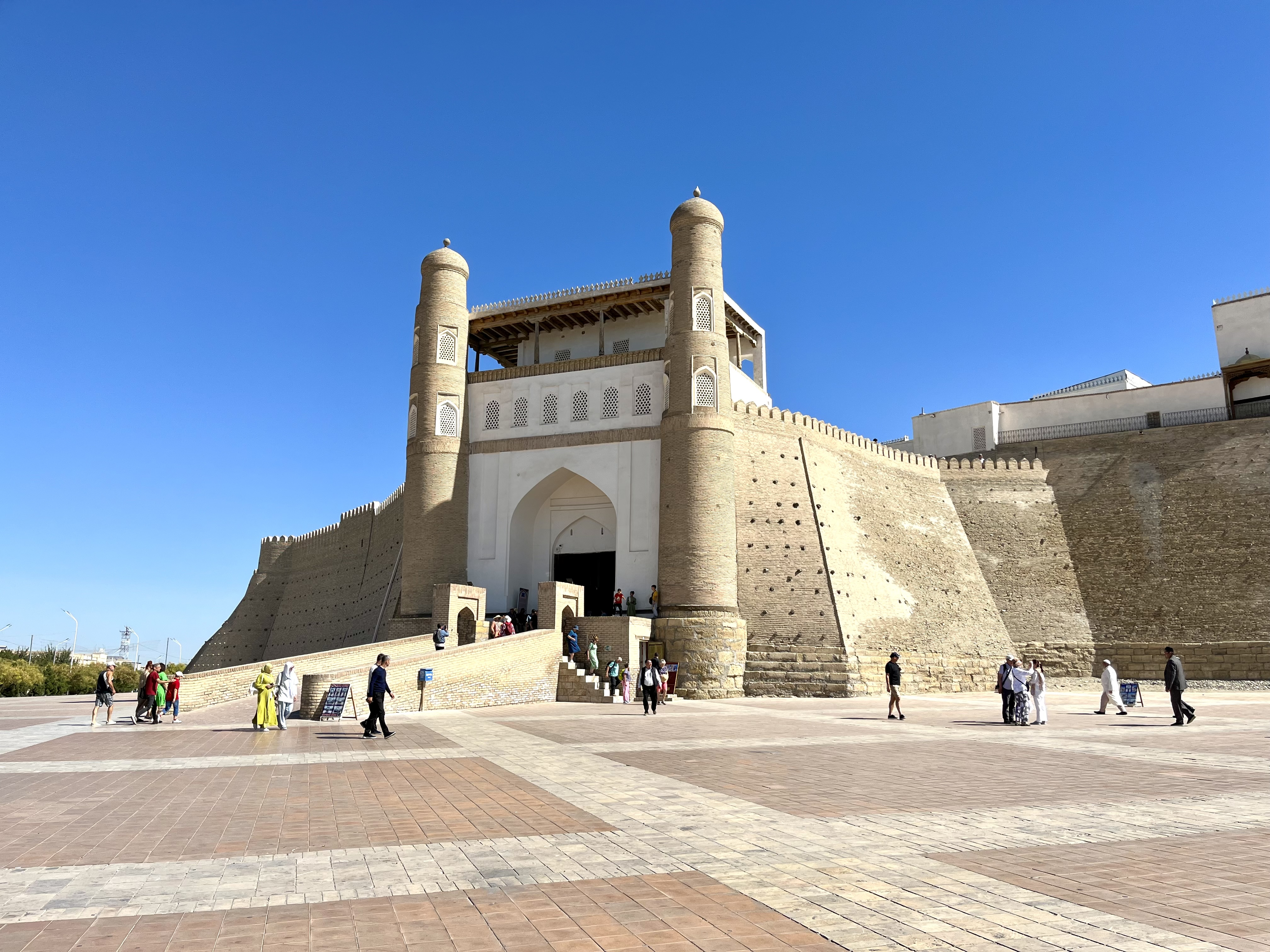
- Entrance to the Ark fortress

Site information
- Condition: Restored

Location
- Ark Fortress in Bukhara, Uzbekistan
- Location within Uzbekistan
- Coordinates: 39°46′40″N 64°24′37″E
- Area: 3.96 ha (9.8 acres)
- Height: 16 to 20 m (52 to 66 ft)

Site history
- Built: 5th century CE; 16th century CE (Present structure)

The Ark of Bukhara is a massive fortress located in the city of Bukhara, Uzbekistan, that was initially built and occupied around the 5th century AD. The Ark's current structure began to develop during the 16th century under the Shaybanid Uzbek dynasty, while all of its existing buildings were constructed in the last three centuries. In addition to being a military structure, the Ark encompassed what was essentially a town that, during much of the fortress's history, was inhabited by the various royal courts that held sway over the region surrounding Bukhara. The Ark was used as a fortress until it fell to the Soviet Union in 1920. Currently, the Ark is a tourist attraction and houses museums covering its history. The museums and other restored areas include an archaeological museum, the throne room, the reception and coronation court, a local history museum, and the court mosque.

== Description ==
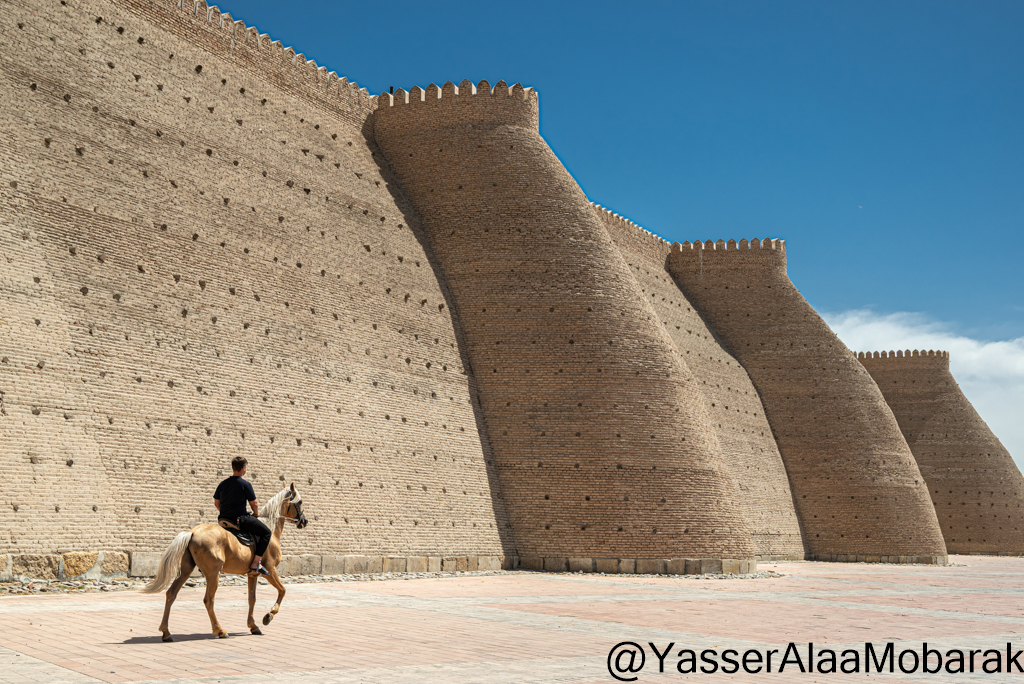
Walls of the Ark

The Ark is a large earthen fortification located in the northwestern part of contemporary Bukhara. In layout, it resembles a modified rectangle, a little elongated from the west to the east. The perimeter of the external walls is 789.6 m (2,591 ft), the area enclosed being 3.96 ha (9.8 acres). The height of the walls varies from 16 to 20 m (52 to 66 ft).

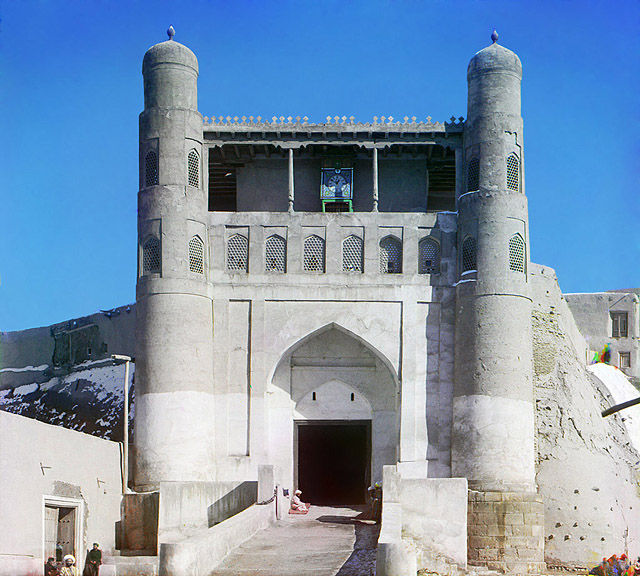
Entrance to the Ark fortress, photographed around 1907 by Sergey Prokudin-Gorsky

The ceremonial entrance into the citadel is architecturally framed by two 18th-century towers. The upper parts of the towers are connected by a gallery, rooms, and terraces. A gradually rising ramp leads through a winch-raised portal and a covered long corridor to the mosque of Dzhuma. The covered corridor offers access to storerooms and prison cells. In the center of the Ark is located a large complex of buildings, one of the best-preserved being the mosque of Ul'dukhtaron, which is connected to legends of forty girls tortured and cast into a well.

== Construction ==
Prince Siyâvash is said to have built the Ark of Bukhara and eventually been buried there. After his death, the great citadel was put out of commission to mourn the prince. Three thousand years later, Budun Bukhar-Khudat restored the citadel. Many aspects of the design of the Ark of Bukhara were influenced by astrological elements. For example, the palace has seven stone pillars for the seven-star constellation Ursa Major. The overall shape of the Ark was also influenced by the constellation. The foundations of the citadel were also influenced by the topography and tombs of the area. There are multiple different kinds of tombs that became a unique feature of Bukhara. Single tombs were located in city buildings and there were also special tombs reserved for important people.

The layout of the city divided it into three sections: the citadel, the madina, and the suburbs. All important buildings such as the mosques and government offices were within the citadel. The mosques within the Ark of Bukhara were made of cotton, wood, clay, and both, raw and baked bricks. The baked bricks were used decoratively to line the mosques. The first mosque, Arslankhan, was built in 1119. Over its 349 year lifespan it was restored and expanded by the rulers, Kohandiz and Sharhristan. The rulers, amirs, and generals all lived inside the walls of the Ark of Bukhara. Outside of the ark were the suburbs where many villages were located. Eventually, the Canpirak wall was built to protect the people of those villages and provide more defense to the citadel.

== Legendary origin ==
In legend, the creator of the Ark was the epic hero Siyavash, locally pronounced Siyavush. As a youth, he hid in the rich oasis country of Turan from his stepmother. Siyavush and the daughter of the local ruler of Afrasiyab fell in love. The girl's father agreed to permit them to marry provided that Siyavush would first build a palace in the area bounded by a bull skin, obviously intended as an impossible task. But Siyavush cut the bull skin into slender strips, connected the ends, and inside this boundary built the palace. Siyavush is a major figure in Ferdowsi's epic, the Shahnameh. (This story of the bull skin also mirrors the classical legend of Dido and the founding of Carthage in North Africa, as recorded in antiquity.)

== History ==
The Ark is built on the remains of earlier structures, which constitute a layer twenty meters deep under the base arch, the layers indicating that previous fortresses had been built and destroyed on the site.

The first known reference to the Ark is contained in the "History of Bukhara" by Narshakhi (899–960). Abubakr wrote "Bindu, the ruler of Bukhara, built this fortress, but it soon was destroyed. Many times it was constructed, many times destroyed." Abubakr says that when the last ruler to rebuild asked counsel of his wise men, they advised him to construct the fortress around seven points, located in the same relation to each other as the stars of the constellation Ursa Major. Thus built, the fortress was never again destroyed.

The age of the Ark has not been established accurately, but by 500 CE it was already the residence of local rulers. Here, in the fastness of the citadel, lived the emirs, their chief viziers, military leaders, and numerous servants.

When the soldiers of Genghis Khan took Bukhara, the inhabitants of the city found refuge in the Ark, but the conquerors smashed the defenders and ransacked the fortress.

In the Middle Ages the fortress was worked on by Rudaki, Ferdowsi, Avicenna, Farabi, and later Omar Khayyám. Here also was kept a great library, of which Avicenna wrote:

I found in this library such books, about which I had not known and which I had never before seen in my life. I read them, and I came to know each scientist and each science. Before me lay gates of inspiration into great depths of knowledge which I had not surmised to exist.

Most probably, the library was destroyed following one of the conquests of Bukhara.

During the Russian Civil War, the Ark was greatly damaged by Red Army troops under the command of Mikhail Frunze during the 1920 Battle of Bukhara. Frunze ordered the Ark bombed by aircraft, which left a large part of the structure in ruins. There is also reason to believe that the last Emir, Mohammed Alim Khan (1880–1944), who escaped to Afghanistan with the royal treasury, ordered the Ark to be blown up so that its sacred places (especially the harem) could not be defiled by the Bolsheviks.

Archaeologists have proved that Bukhara emerged south of the lower course of the Zaravshan, which splits here into several channels, on a low marshy plain, above which a massive artificial hill of the city citadel - Ark still rises. As scientists believed, this citadel was a sprawling, repeatedly rebuilt and completed fortified manor. In the 5th to 6th centuries it had already expanded so much that it became a strong fortress with two gates (on the west and on the east), high above the plain. Legends attribute a long history to Bukhara and link its foundation to the mythical hero Siyâvash, whose tomb was supposed to be at the eastern gate of the Ark. In Kushan times, a village appeared at a short distance from the Ark and to the southeast of it, eventually transformed into a regularly organized Shahristan.

In the 7th century, the fortifications of the citadel were reconstructed and a new palace of Bukhar Khudahs was erected in it, the plan of which, as Narshakhi tells us, repeated the shape of the constellation of the Ursa Major for magical purposes. Next to the palace were built chancery buildings, a treasury, a prison and a temple. Beyond the western gate of the Ark stretched cultivated lands and gardens, above which rose more than two thousand fortified castles and stood hundreds of country estates, also fortified and not much different from castles. The gates overlooked the square called Registan - "Sandy". The eastern gate, later destroyed, faced the nearby shahristan.

In the 8th century, by the arrival of the Arabs there were a palace of Bukhar Khudahs, the sacred tomb of the legendary hero Siyâvash and a temple, which Qutayba ibn Muslim turned into a mosque. The first mosque of Bukhara was built by Arabs in 713 in Ark on the place of a "pagan" temple. This mosque was moved from the citadel down to the area between Ark and shahristan at the end of the 8th century.

During the Samanid period, between the western high facade of the Ark and the wall of the rabad, the Registan Square was created, and a palace with a portal was built here, which al-Istakhri recognized as the grandest in the countries of Islam. The portal faced the entrance to the Ark.

== Archaeological excavations and restoration ==
During the period of the Bukhara People's Soviet Republic, the western wall of the Ark was restored. A. A. Semyonov reported that a commission called the "Society of History" was established with the intention of writing the history of Ark.

In the 1970s and 1980s, partial archaeological excavations were carried out in the Ark. Extensive archaeological excavations, especially in the southern part of the Ark and the surrounding area, had not yet been conducted. According to archaeologists, these excavations could provide more precise information about the actual age of Bukhara and either confirm or refute the legendary accounts of Narshahi, which claimed that Bukhara was 3,000 years old in the 10th century.

From 1970 to 1974, significant stationary excavations were conducted on the Ark by a special archaeological team under the overall leadership of the academician of the Uzbekistan Academy of Sciences, Ya. G. Gulyamov. The upper layers dating from the 16th to the early 20th centuries were excavated within the fortress on an area of 120x100 meters.

In 1979–1980, for the first time in the history of archaeological research of the Bukhara Ark, a stratigraphic trench (6x6 meters) allowed for deeper exploration of the mainland layer. The thickness of cultural deposits exceeded 20 meters here, with a third of this depth hidden underground. At a depth of 13-15.5 meters and 16.5-18.5 meters, remains of two robust adobe walls were discovered, possibly part of the ancient defensive structures of the Ark. The first wall, preserved to a height of 2.5-3 meters, dates back to the 4th to 5th centuries AD based on ceramic material, while the second wall, with a height of 2-2.5 meters, dates back to the 4th-3rd centuries BC. Undoubtedly, these are the ruins of the ancient fortress wall of Bukhara, which was one of the most important features in the city's development.

A complete stratigraphic section of the fortress walls of the Ark was also studied. According to archaeological data obtained by E. G. Nekrasova in the stratigraphic section of the northern fortress wall of the Ark, the earliest wall was constructed from several layers of loess and loess blocks, with a height of 0.9-1.0 meters and a thickness of 0.7-0.75 meters. Its maximum width was 7.5 meters, and the minimum was 2.75 meters.

In preparation for the 2,500th anniversary of Bukhara, on the initiative and under the leadership of the President of the Republic of Uzbekistan Islam Karimov (1990–2016), restoration work was carried out on the Ark.

== Gallery ==
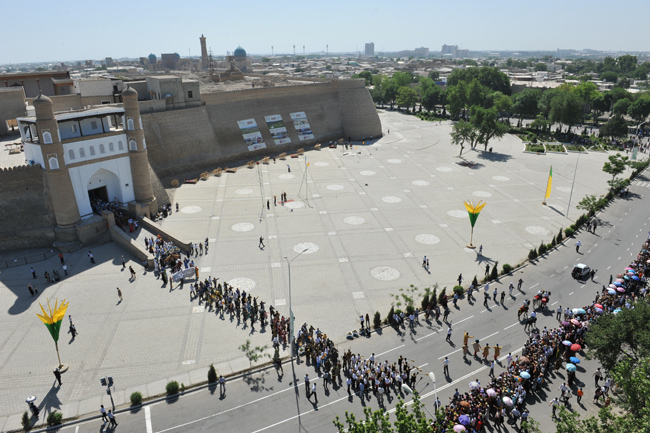
Plaza and Ark walls, with tourists lined up at the entrance

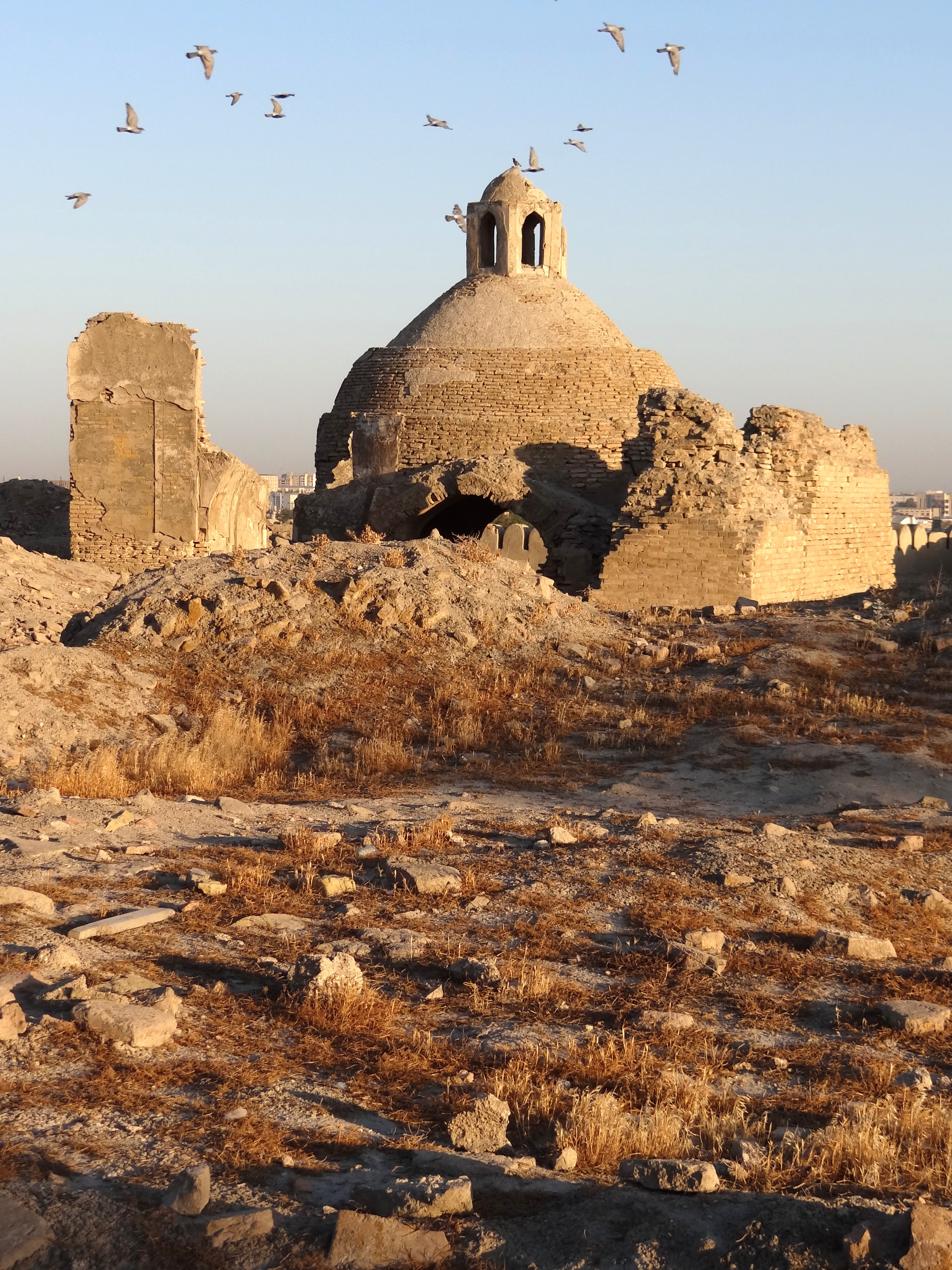
Ruins of a mosque destroyed in the 1920 bombing, in the desolated back area of the Ark

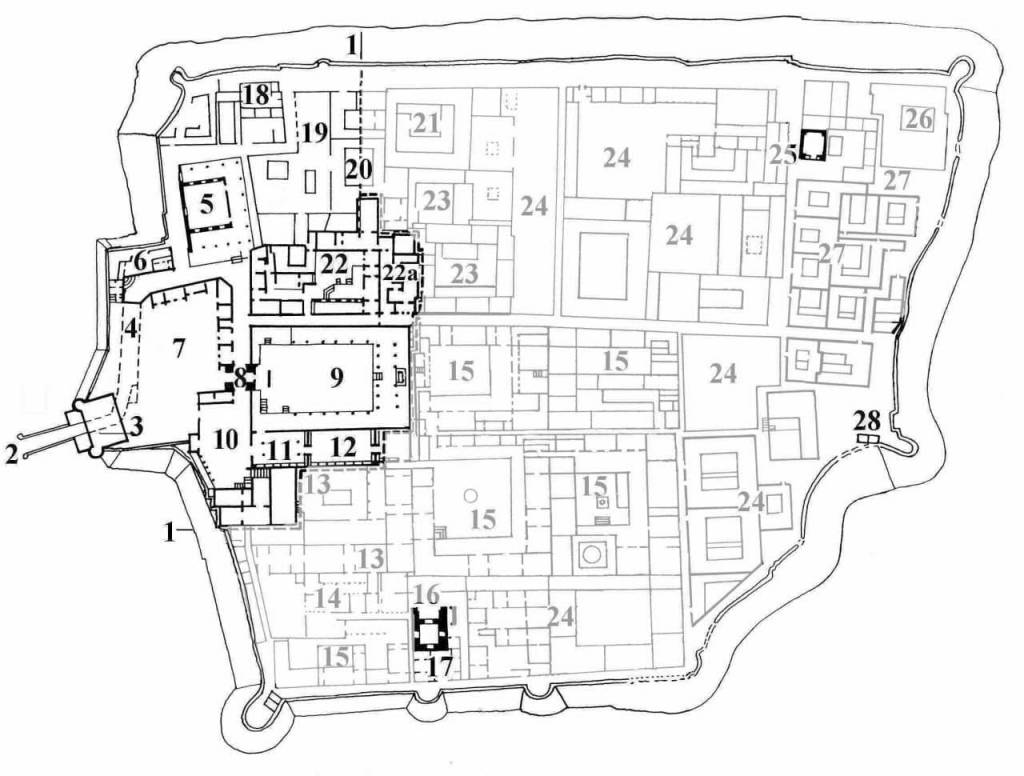
Map of the Ark; destroyed buildings are shown in grey

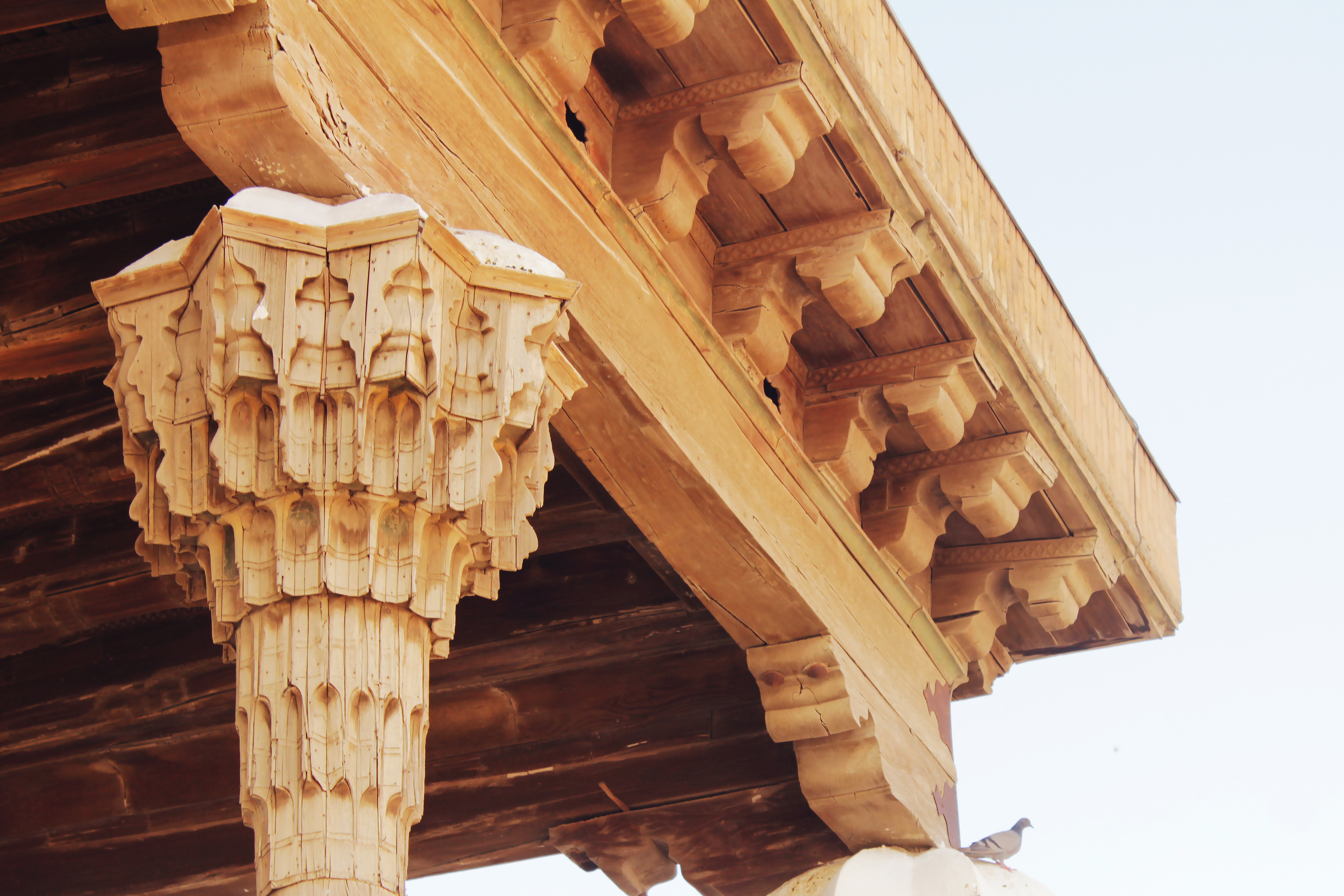
Court Mosque detail, cornice and pillar capital

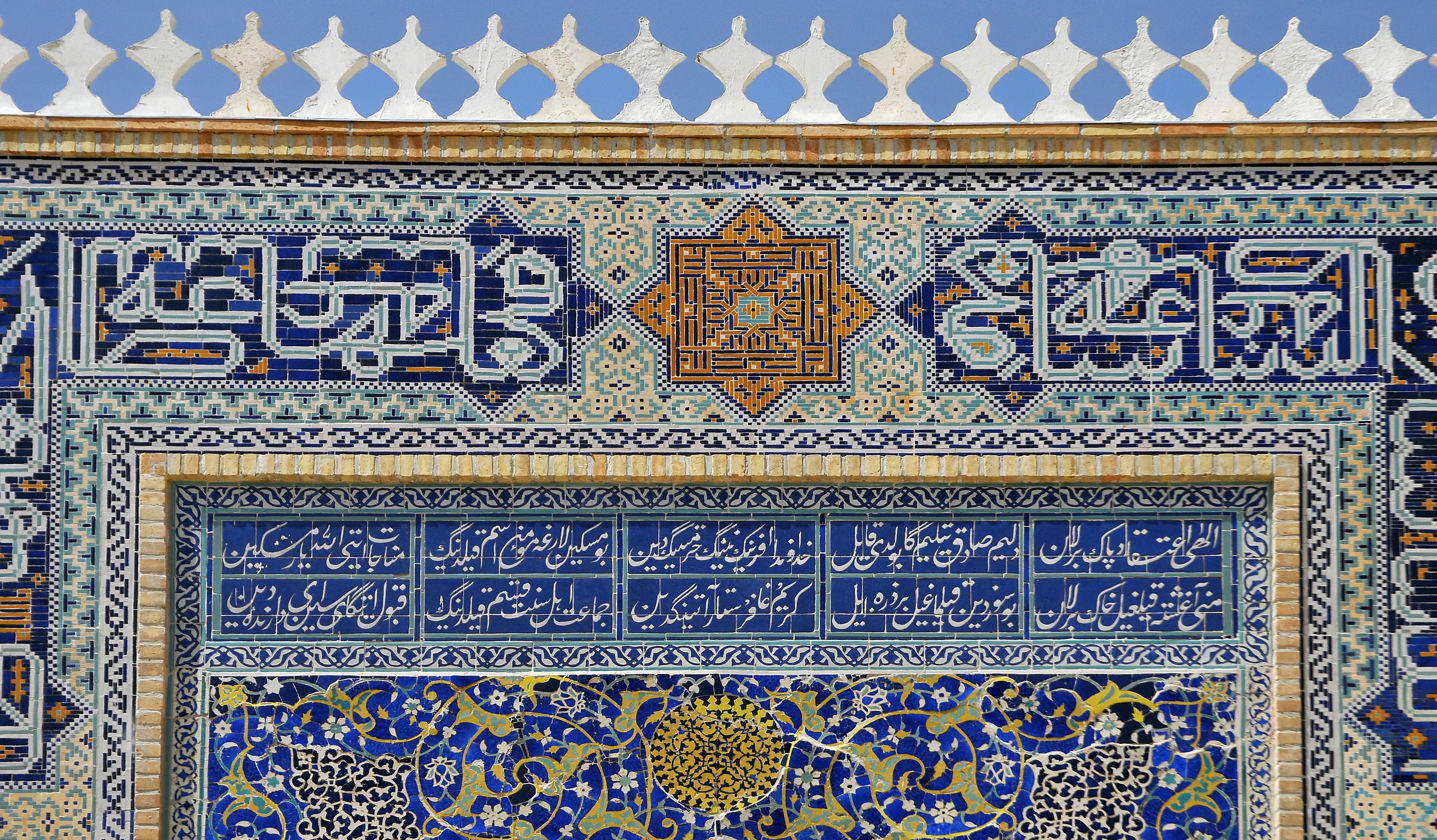
Detail, emir's reception and hearing courtyard

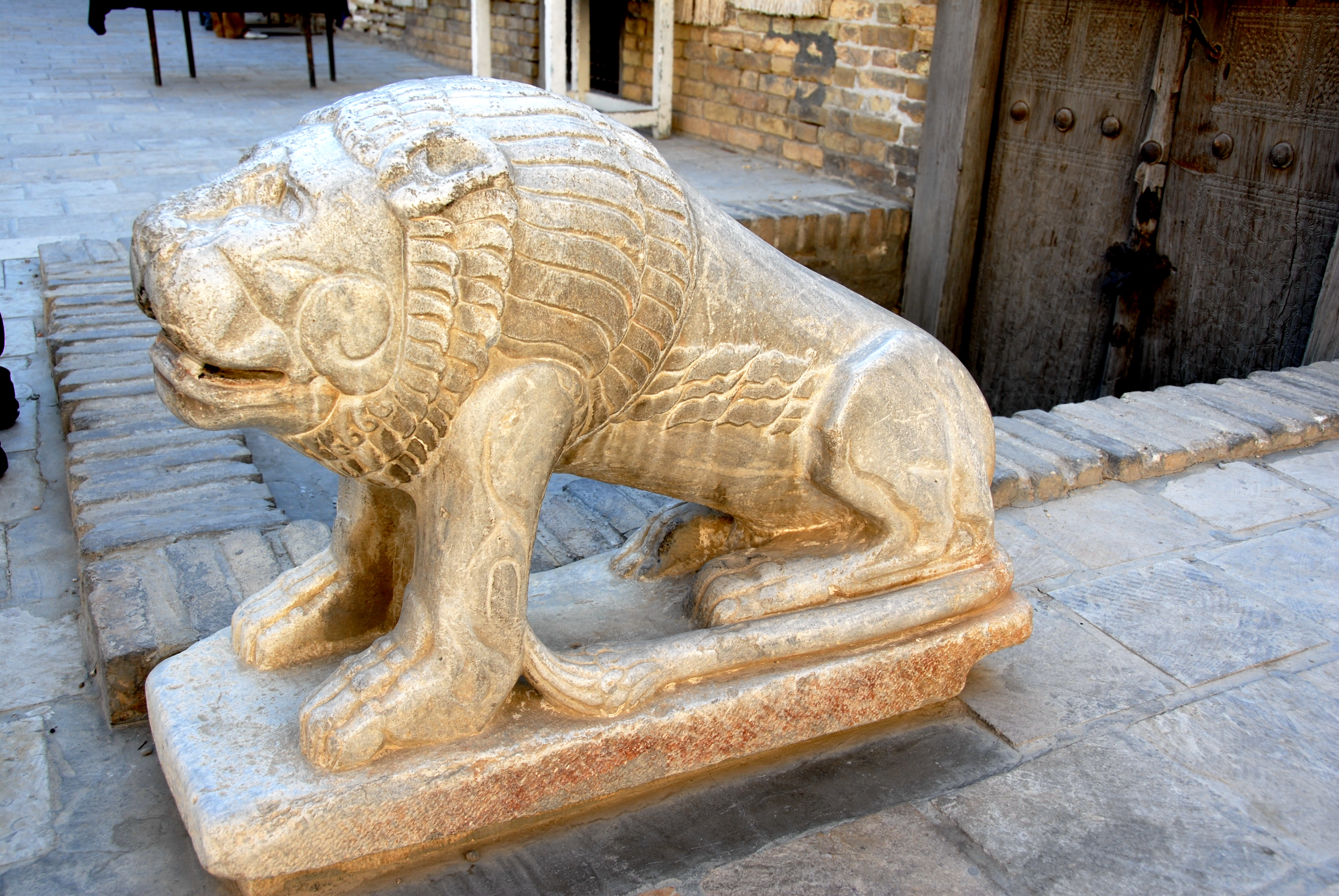
The Lion

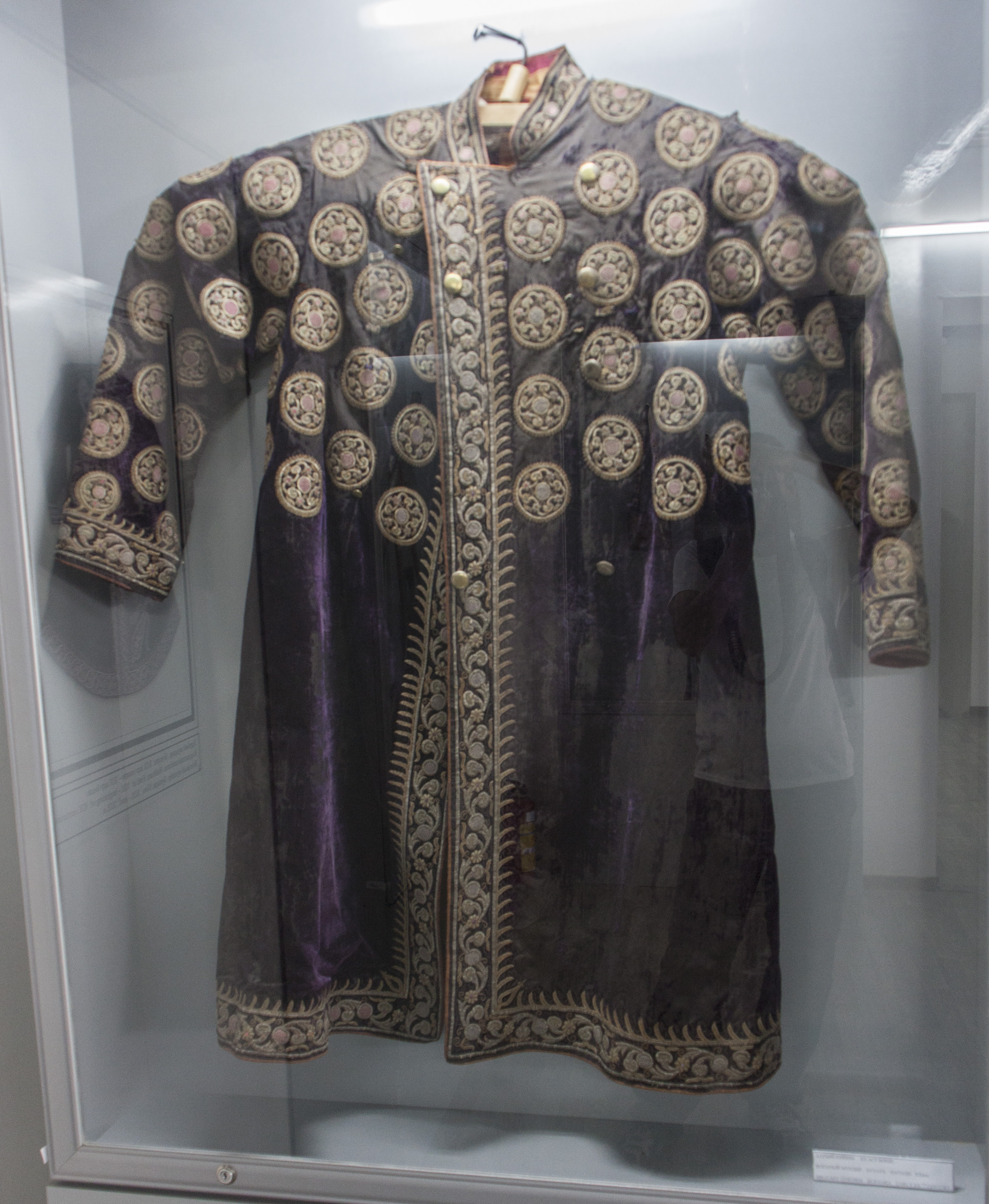
Military uniform, Bukhara

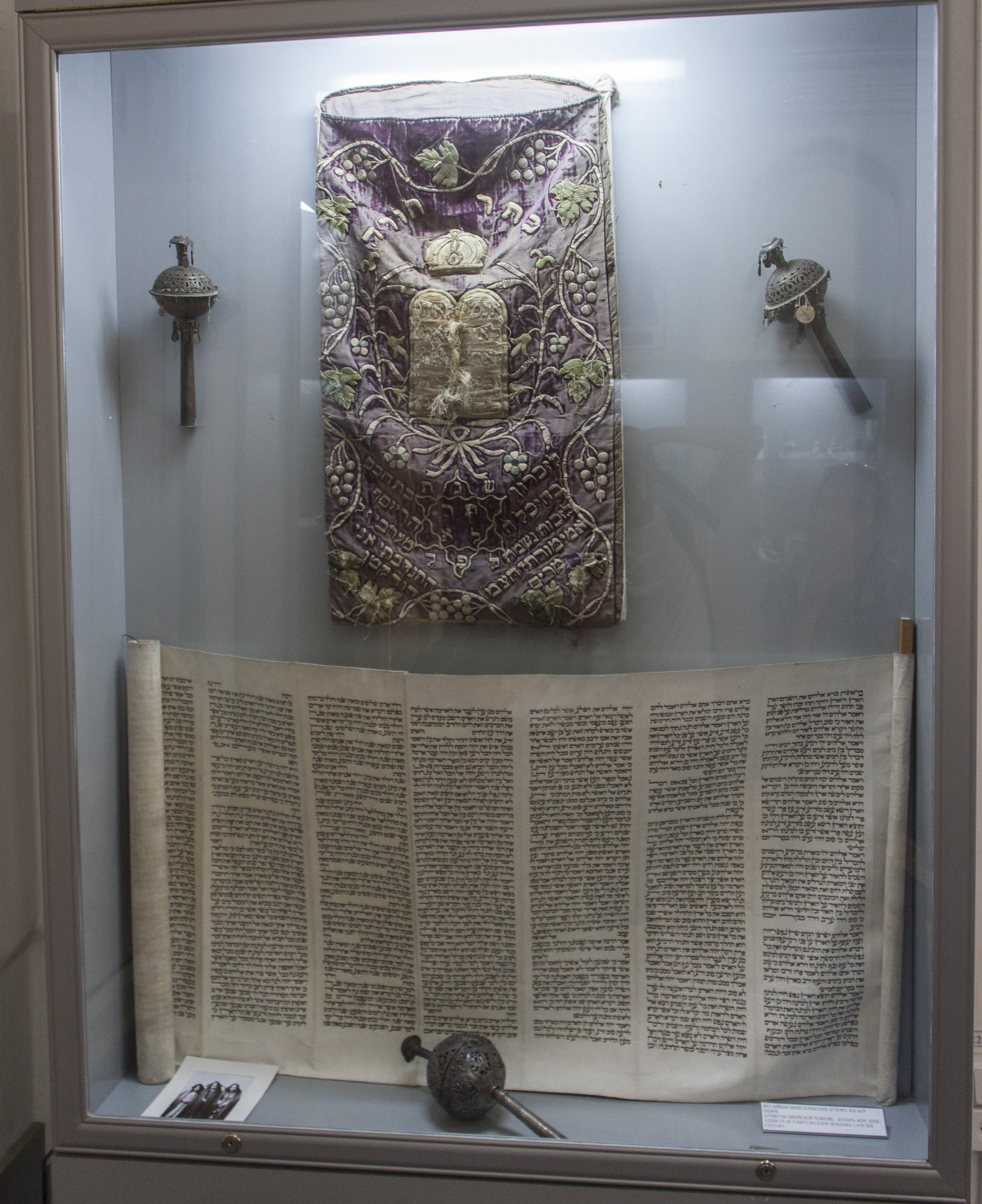
Torah, Bukhara, from 19th century
