= Varakhsha =

Archaeological site in Uzbekistan

- Varakhsha
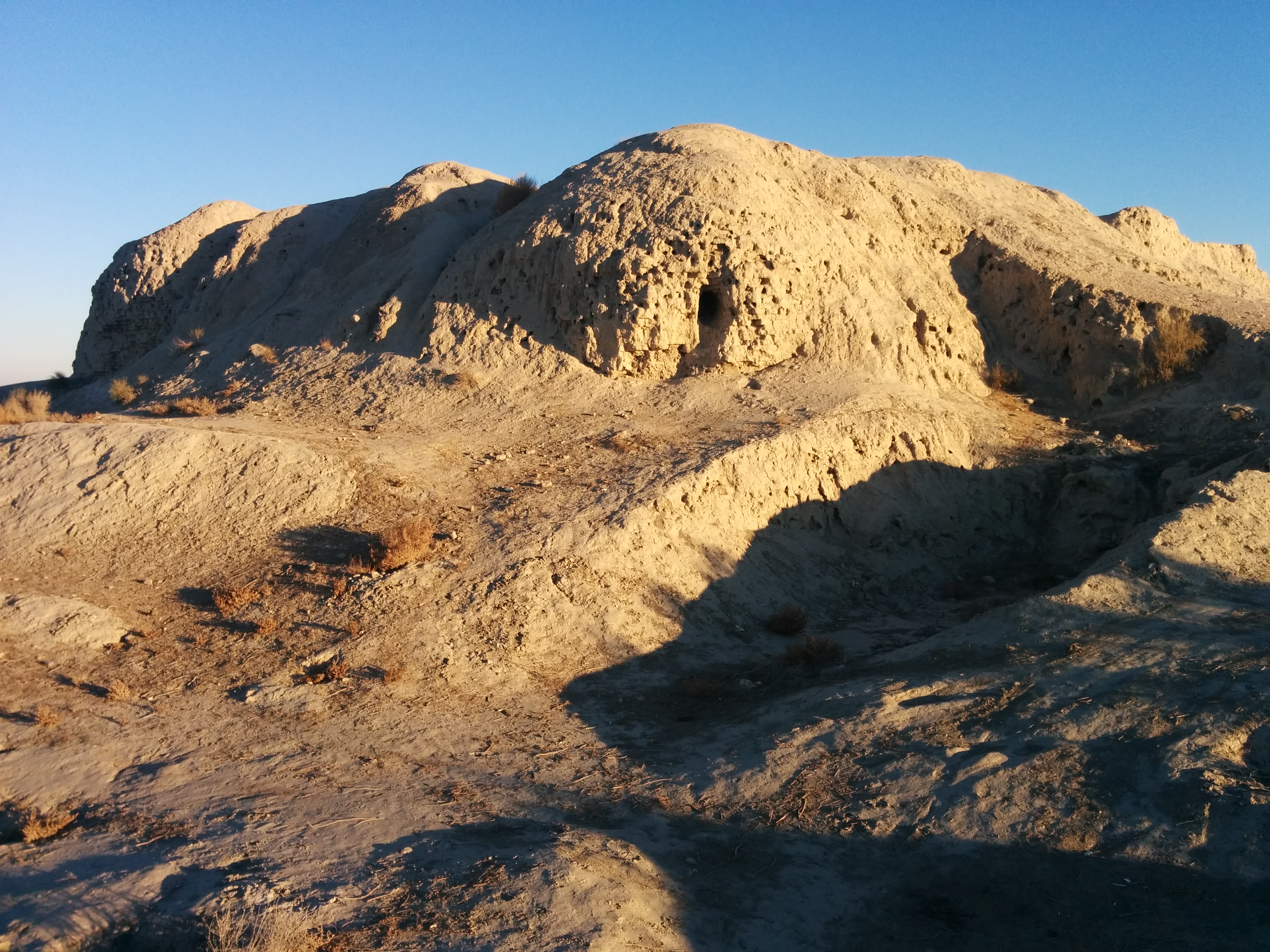
- Ruins of Varakhsha

- Location within West and Central Asia Location within Uzbekistan
- 39°51′49″N 64°04′23″E
- Type: Settlement
- Location: Uzbekistan

Site notes
- Condition: Ruined

UNESCO World Heritage Site
- Part of: Silk Roads: Zarafshan-Karakum Corridor
- Criteria: Cultural: ii, iii, v
- Reference: 1675-024
- Inscription: 2023 (45th Session)

Varakhsha, also Varasha or Varahsha, was an ancient city in the Bukhara oasis in Sogdia, founded in the 1st century BCE. It is located 39 kilometers to the northwest of Bukhara. Varakhsha was the capital of the Sogdian dynasty of the kings of Bukhara, the Bukhar Khudahs. It ultimately never recovered from the Muslim conquest of Transoxiana. After British archaeologists began investigating the site in the 1820s, it became "the very first Sogdian archaeological site mentioned in European literature."

== Murals ==
Murals dating from the 8th century CE have been recovered from the palace area. They show a king and his retinue riding elephants and fighting tigers and monstrous beasts.

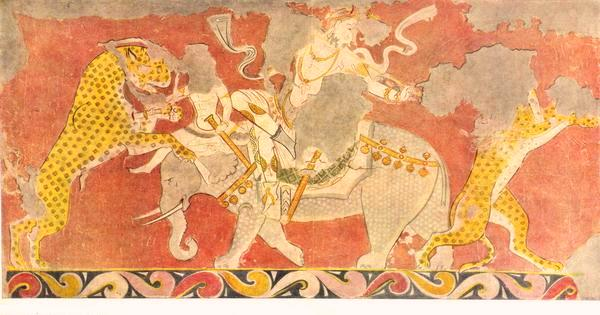
Varahsha mural from the red room of the Palace. Museum of Arts of Uzbekistan.

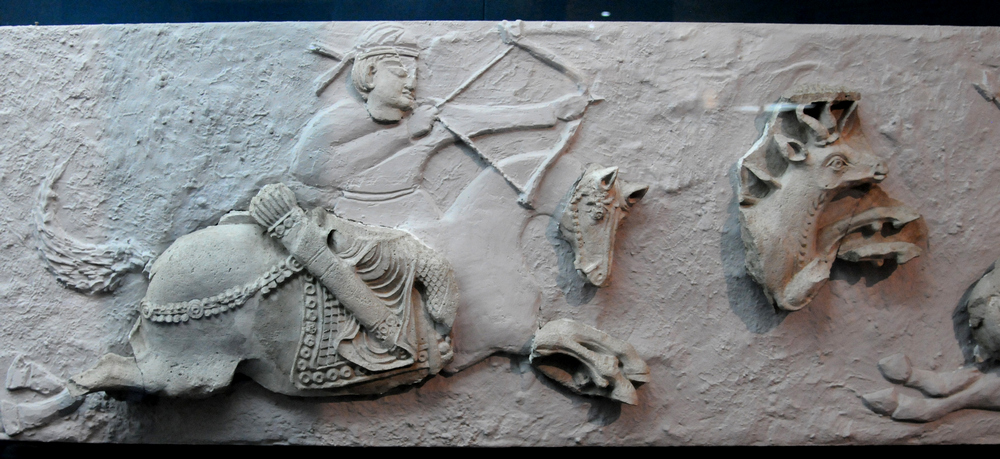
Varahsha, Relief of a hunter, 5th-7th century CE. State Museum of History of Uzbekistan

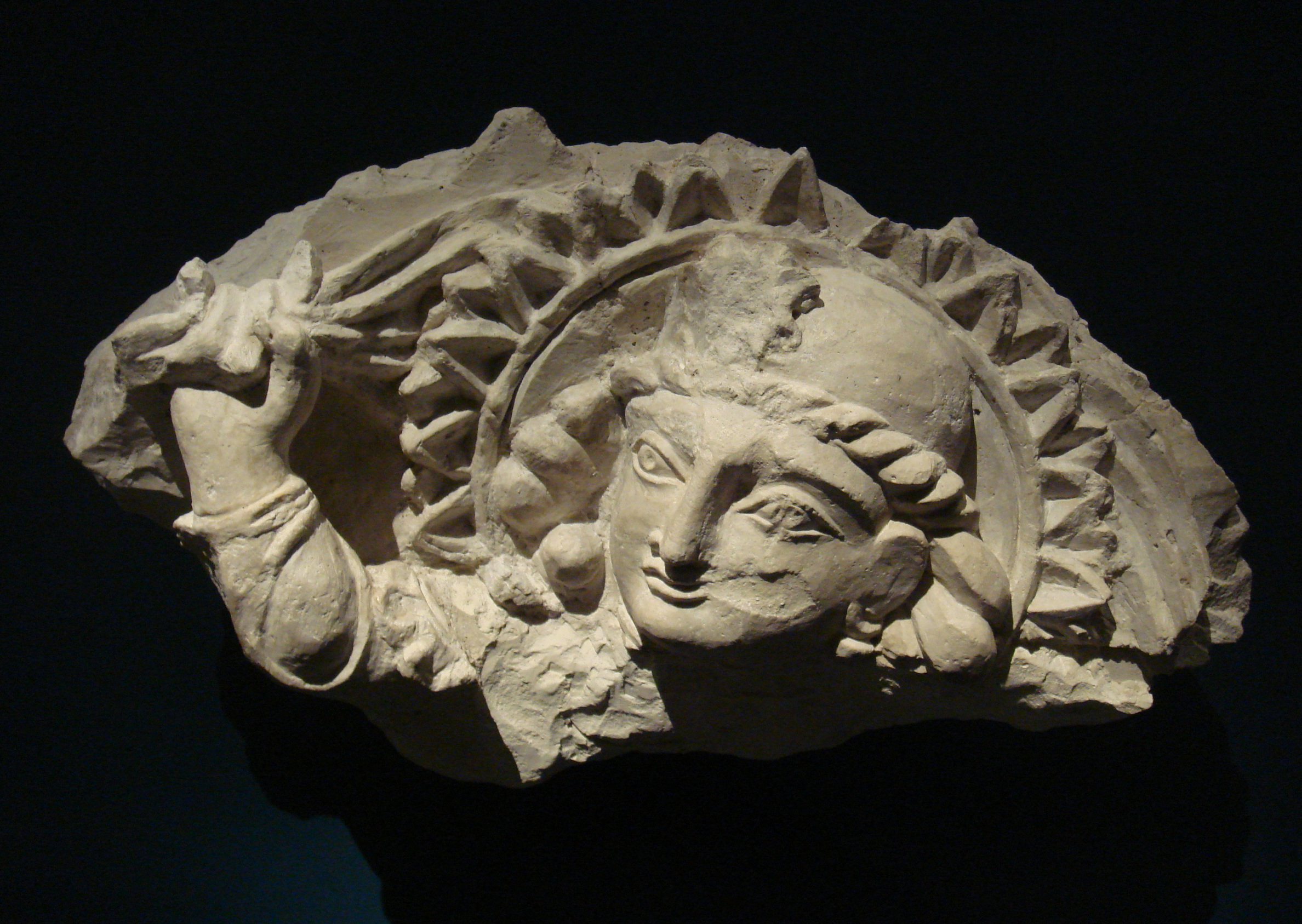
Varakhsha high-relief, end of 8th century.

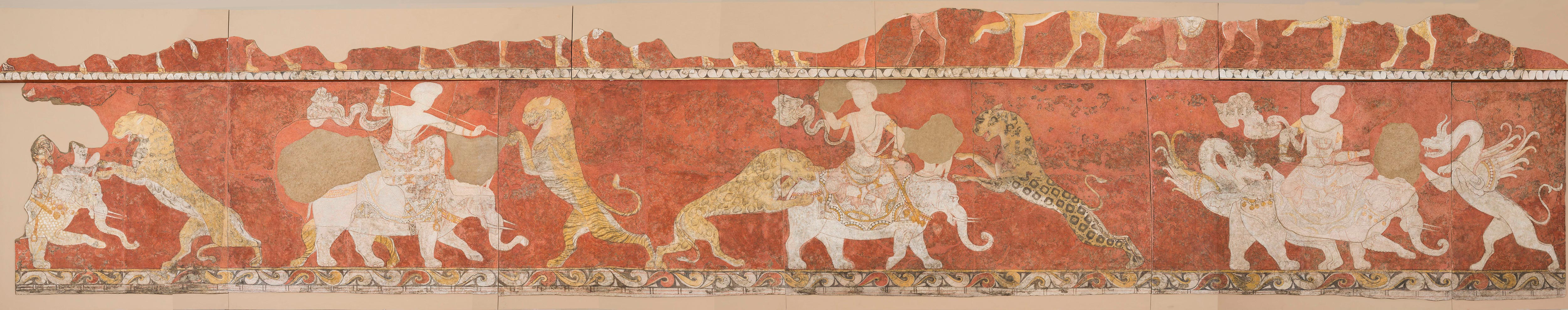
Wall Paintings in the Palace at Varakhsha located in the Hermitage Museum.
