= List of Sogdian states =

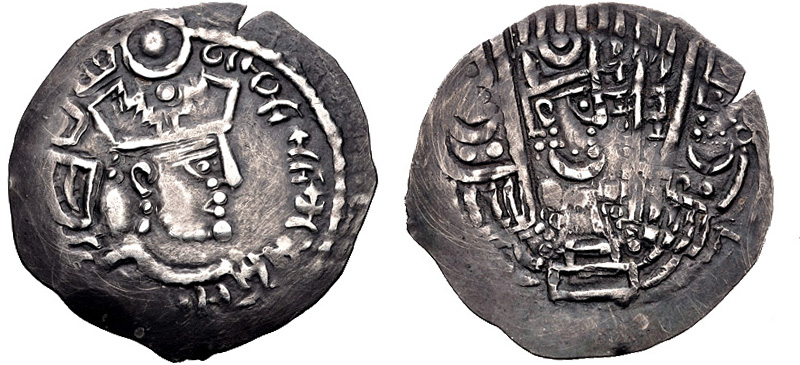
Coin of Khunak, one of the rulers of Bukhara.

The Sogdian states refers to a number of independent or autonomous city-states in the Iranian region of Sogdia in late antiquity and the medieval period. Most of the city-states were ruled by a king or queen, who was called "first among equals". However, the succession of rule was not stable, and the people could influence who would become the new ruler. The period, which experienced its peak in the 7th century, ended with the conquest of Transoxiana by the Islamic Caliphate.

Bukhara and Samarkand – the famous cities of Persian literature – were the largest and wealthiest Sogdian states.

== List ==
- Kangju (100 BCE - 500 AD), was the Chinese name for a Sogdian state in Transoxiana, considered the second most powerful state in the region. Their territory covered the region of the Ferghana Valley and the area between the Amu Darya and Syr Darya rivers, with the core territory along the middle Syr Darya, with their capital being a city called Beitian.
- Principality of Ushrusana (600 AD - 893 AD), a Sogdian local dynasty ruling the Ushrusana region, in the northern area of modern Tajikistan. Prior to the Islamic conquests, they were Zoroastrian. They converted to Islam after being subjugated by the Samanid Empire, in which saw the end of the dynasty
- Bukhar Khudas (681 AD - 890 AD), a local Sogdian Zoroastrian dynasty which ruled over Bukhara before being incorporated by the Samanids.
- Principality of Farghana (712 AD - 819 AD), a Sogdian dynasty which ruled over the Farghana region. They were an autonomous principality under the Umayyads, Türgesh and Tang dynasty until the Samanids put an end to their rule over the region in 819 AD.
