= Tughshada =

- Bukhar Khudah
- Reign: 681 — 739
- Predecessor: Bindu
- Successor: Qutayba
- Born: 681; Bukhara, Sogdia
- Died: 739; Bukhara, Sogdia
- Father: Bindu
- Mother: "Khatun of Bukhara"
- Religion: Zoroastrianism

Tughshada was Bukhar Khudah (king of Bukhara) from 681 to 739. He was the son and successor of Bindu.

== Biography ==
Map of Khorasan, Transoxiana and Tokharistan.

Tughshada was born in ca. 681—a few months later, during the Muslim conquest of Transoxiana, Bindu was killed by the Umayyad general Salm ibn Ziyad. Tughshada, who was a few months old, then succeeded him. However, the kingdom was in reality controlled by Tughshada's mother, who is only known by her title of Khatun, and is celebrated in the local historical tradition for her wisdom and capable management. She is reported to have held court daily, "inquired into the affairs of state and issued orders and prohibitions," while at a distance stood "two hundred youths from the landowners and the princes ready for service, girded with gold belts and bearing swords." In 676 she dispatched a contingent to aid an Arab assault on Samarqand.

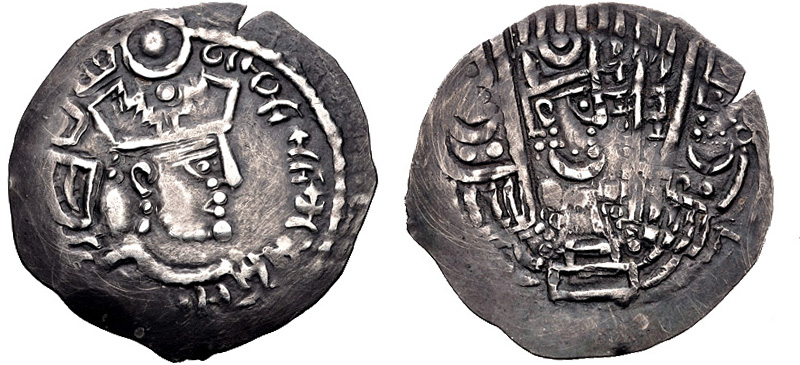
Coin of Khunuk

In 706, a civil war erupted in Bukhara and its surrounding cities and towns; the ruler of the nearby Wardana, known as the Wardan Khudah, had seized most of the principality, while a Sogdian magnate named Khunuk Khudah, managed to rally the nobles of Bukhara around him and declared himself as the Bukhar Khudah. At the same time, the new Umayyad governor of Khurasan, Qutayba ibn Muslim, had captured Paykand, a city near Bukhara. The city soon revolted, and the Arabs responded by sacking the city. The brutality of the sack of Paykand shocked the Sogdian world, and led the nobles of Bukhara under Khunuk to make an alliance with the Wardan Khudah. However, during the fighting between the Arabs and Sogdians, the Wardan Khudah was killed, which probably constituted a heavy blow to the Bukhara-Wardana alliance. Bukhara was shortly after captured by Qutayba, who imposed a tribute of 200,000 dirhams, and installed an Arab garrison to secure against rebellion. During the same time, another Sogdian king named Tarkhun, who was the ruler of Samarkand, acknowledged the authority of the Umayyad Caliphate. After having settled an affair in Tokharistan, Qutayba restored Bukhara to the young Tughshada, and the faction of Khunuk including himself were executed.

Later, in 712/3, in order spread Islam in Bukhara, Qutayba built a mosque in the city's citadel, and even encouraged the natives to convert by paying them to attend the prayers. However, Islamization proceeded very slowly, and the rulers of Bukhara would remain Zoroastrian until their downfall. Tughshada, however, still tried to achieve independence from the Umayyad Caliphate, and in 718, along with Tarkhun's successor Gurak, Narayana, the king of Kumadh, and Tish, the king of Chaghaniyan, he sent an embassy to the Tang dynasty of China, where they asked for aid against the Arabs. In ca. 728, an anti-Arab revolt erupted in Bukhara, which was suppressed one year later. Tughshada was assassinated by two angry dehqan nobles in 739, and was succeeded by his son Qutayba, who was named in honour of the Umayyad general.

== Sources ==
- Bosworth, C.E. (1986). "Ḳutayba b. Muslim". In Bosworth, C. E.; van Donzel, E.; Lewis, B. & Pellat, Ch. (eds.). The Encyclopaedia of Islam, Second Edition. Volume V: Khe–Mahi. Leiden: E. J. Brill. pp. 541–542. ISBN 978-90-04-07819-2.
- Gibb, H. A. R. (1923). The Arab Conquests in Central Asia. London: The Royal Asiatic Society.
- Shaban, M. A. (1979). The 'Abbāsid Revolution. Cambridge: Cambridge University Press. ISBN 0-521-29534-3.
- B. A. Litvinsky, Ahmad Hasan Dani (1996). History of Civilizations of Central Asia: The crossroads of civilizations, A.D. 250 to 750. UNESCO. ISBN 9789231032110.
- Bosworth, C. Edmund. "BUKHARA ii. From the Arab Invasions to the Mongols". Encyclopaedia Iranica, Vol. IV, Fasc. 5. London et al.: C. Edmund Bosworth. pp. 513–515.
- Wellhausen, Julius (1927). The Arab Kingdom and Its Fall. Translated by Margaret Graham Weir. Calcutta: University of Calcutta.

Preceded by Bindu	Bukhar Khudah; 681–739	Succeeded by Qutayba
