= Bukhar Khudahs =

Ancient Iranian dynasty

Bukhar Khudahs βuxārak Xwaday
- before 681–890s
- Location of the Bukhar Khudahs, and their capital of Bukhara, with neighbouring polities. Map showing Bukhara in Sogdia including other regions and cities
- Capital: Bukhara
- Common languages: Sogdian
- Religion: Zoroastrianism (also Manichaeism, Buddhism, Christianity, Islam)
- Government: Monarchy
- Bukhar Khudah
  - ???-681: Bidun (first mentioned ruler)
  - ???-890s: Abu Ishaq Ibrahim (last)
- Historical era: Middle Ages
  - Established: before 681
  - Samanid conquest: 890s
Succeeded by
Samanid Empire

The Bukhar Khudahs or Bukhar Khudats (Sogdian: βuxārak Xwaday) were a local Sogdian dynasty, which ruled the city of Bukhara from an unknown date to the reign of the Samanid ruler Isma'il ibn Ahmad, who incorporated Bukhara into the Samanid state.

== Etymology ==
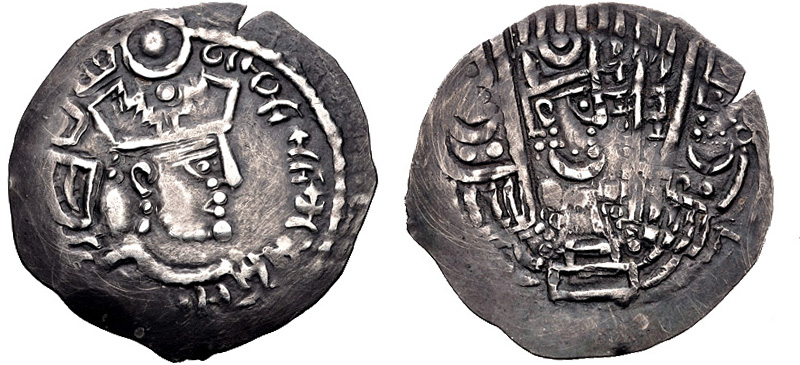
Coin of Khunuk

The word “Bukhar” means Bukhara, while “khuda” means “lord”. Thus the word means “the lord of Bukhara”.

== History ==
The founding date of the Bukhar Khudahs remains unknown; the 10th-century Iranian historian Narshakhi is known to have mentioned several names of rulers of Bukhara, but it is not known if they were all from the same dynasty. The first ruler mentioned by Narshakhi is Abru'i (also spelled Abarzi). According to Narshakhi, he was a cruel ruler, who was overthrown by a certain Turkic king named Qara Jurin. The next ruler is named Kana, who is said to have introduced the minting of coins in Bukhara, which is, however, doubted by modern scholars. The next ruler is given as Makh, who was credited with the building of a bazaar that was named after him. The first ruler mentioned with the title of Bukhar Khudah is named Bidun, who was killed in 681 by the Umayyad general Salm ibn Ziyad during the first Arab attempts to conquer Transoxiana. He was succeeded by his few months-old son Tughshada. However, the kingdom was in reality controlled by Tughshada's mother, who is only known by her title of Khatun of Bukhara, and is celebrated in the local historical tradition for her wisdom and capable management. She is reported to have held court daily, "inquired into the affairs of state and issued orders and prohibitions," while at a distance stood "two hundred youths from the landowners and the princes ready for service, girded with gold belts and bearing swords." In 676 she dispatched a contingent to aid an Arab assault on Samarqand.

In 706, a civil war erupted in Bukhara and its surrounding cities and towns; the ruler of the nearby Wardana, known as the Wardan Khudah, had seized most of the principality, while a Sogdian magnate named Khunuk Khudah, managed to rally the nobles of Bukhara around him and declared himself as the Bukhar Khudah. At the same time, the new Umayyad governor of Khurasan, Qutayba ibn Muslim, had captured Paykand, a city near Bukhara. The city soon revolted, and the Arabs responded by sacking the city. The brutality of the sack of Paykand shocked the Sogdian world, and led the nobles of Bukhara under Khunuk to make an alliance with the Wardan Khudah. However, during the fighting between the Arabs and Sogdians, the Wardan Khudah was killed, which probably constituted a heavy blow to the Bukhara-Wardana alliance. Bukhara was shortly after captured by Qutayba, who imposed a tribute of 200,000 dirhams, and installed an Arab garrison to secure against rebellion. During the same time, another Sogdian king named Tarkhun, who was the ruler of Samarkand, acknowledged the authority of the Umayyad Caliphate. After having settled an affair in Tokharistan, Qutayba restored Bukhara to the young Tughshada, and the faction of Khunuk including himself were executed.

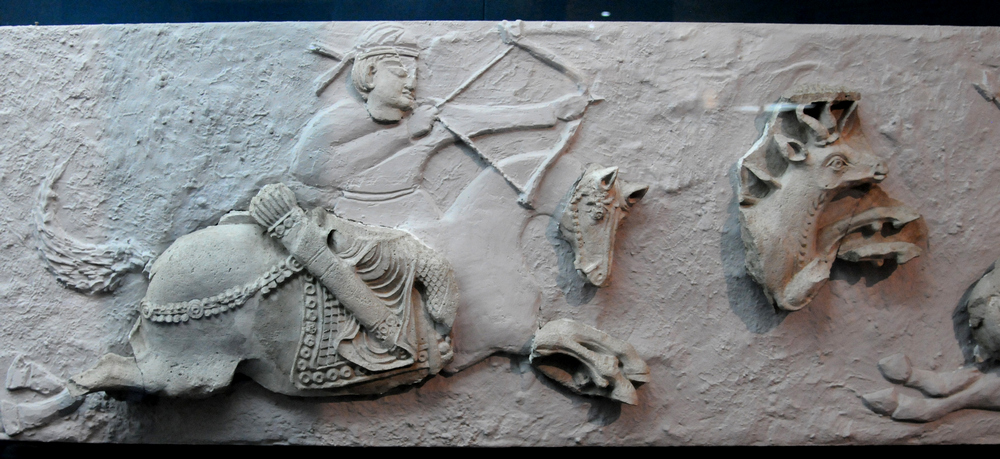
Relief of a hunter, Varahsha, 5th-7th century CE.

Later, in 712/3, in order to spread Islam in Bukhara, Qutayba built a mosque in the city's citadel, and even encouraged the natives to convert by paying them to attend the prayers. However, Islamization proceeded very slowly, and the rulers of Bukhara would remain Zoroastrian until their downfall. Tughshada, however, still tried to achieve independence from the Umayyad Caliphate, and in 718, along with Tarkhun's successor Gurak, Narayana, the king of Kumadh, and Tish, the king of Chaghaniyan, he sent an embassy to the Tang dynasty of China, where they asked for aid against the Arabs. In ca. 728, an anti-Arab revolt erupted in Bukhara, which was suppressed one year later. Tughshada was assassinated by two angry dehqan nobles in 739, and was succeeded by his son Qutayba, who was named in honour of the Umayyad general.

In 750, the Umayyad Caliphate was conquered by the Abbasid Caliphate, who became the new masters of Central Asia. However, this erupted in a local rebellion in Bukhara led by a certain Sharik ibn Shaikh. The Abbasid general Abu Muslim Khorasani sent an army under Ziyad ibn Salih to suppress the rebellion, but the rebels managed to emerge victorious. Qutayba, at the head of an army numbering 10,000 soldiers, aided the Abbasids in their fight against Sharik, and in the end managed to defeat and kill the latter. However, because of Qutayba's attitude towards the Arabs, he was murdered in 750 at the orders of Abu Muslim Khorasani, and was succeeded by his brother Sakan, who ruled until ca. 757 when he too was murdered by Abbasid agents. He was succeeded by another brother named Bunyat, who, because of his support to al-Muqanna, was murdered in 783. After the rule of Bunyat, there is no information about any of his successors, except for the last ruler of Bukhara, Abu Ishaq Ibrahim, whose kingdom was annexed by the Samanid ruler Isma'il ibn Ahmad. Abu Ishaq died in 913, but his descendants' royal status was still known during the lifetime of Narshakhi.

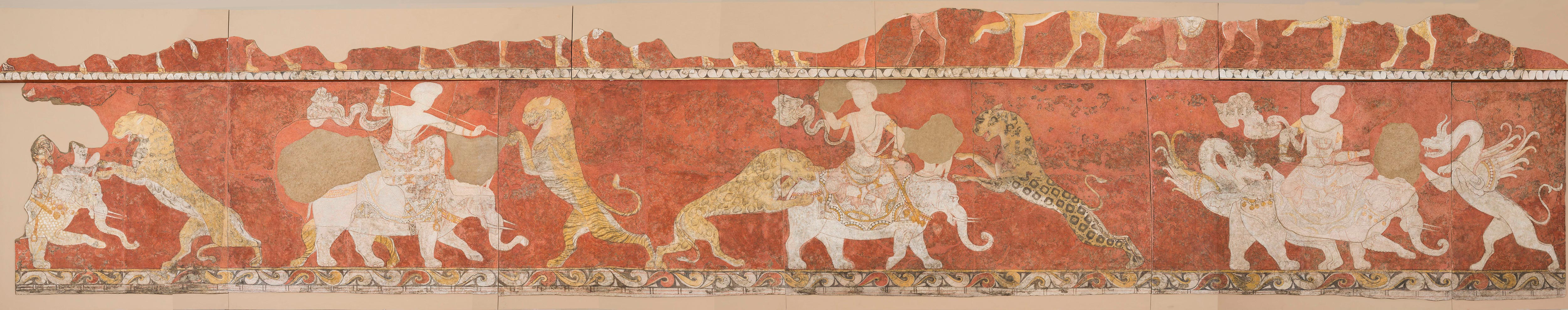
Wall Paintings in the Palace at Varakhsha. Hermitage Museum.

== Religion ==
The majority of the inhabitants of Bukhara, including the rulers of the city, were Zoroastrians. However, there were also traces of Nestorian Christianity, and even a church in Bukhara during the rule of the Bukhar Khudahs is mentioned by Narshakhi.

According to legend, Bukharan Jews are exiles from the tribes of Naphtali and Issachar during the Assyrian captivity, basing this assumption on a reading of "Habor" at II Kings 17:6 as a reference to Bukhara. However, modern day scholarship associate this telling with European myths, where stories about the "Ten Lost Tribes" had been propagated in Europe.

== Sources ==
- Bosworth, C.E. (1986). "Ḳutayba b. Muslim". The Encyclopedia of Islam, New Edition, Volume V: Khe–Mahi. Leiden and New York: BRILL. pp. 541–542. ISBN 90-04-07819-3.
- Gibb, H. A. R. (1923). The Arab Conquests in Central Asia. London: The Royal Asiatic Society. OCLC 685253133.
- Shaban, M. A. (1979). The 'Abbāsid Revolution. Cambridge: Cambridge University Press. ISBN 0-521-29534-3.
- Litvinsky, B. A.; Dani, Ahmad Hasan (1996). History of Civilizations of Central Asia: The crossroads of civilizations, A.D. 250 to 750. UNESCO. ISBN 9789231032110.
- Bosworth, C. Edmund. "BUKHARA ii. From the Arab Invasions to the Mongols". Encyclopaedia Iranica, Vol. IV, Fasc. 5. London et al.: C. Edmund Bosworth. pp. 513–515.
- Wellhausen, Julius (1927). The Arab Kingdom and its Fall. Translated by Margaret Graham Weir. Calcutta: University of Calcutta. OCLC 752790641.
- Frye, Richard N. "BUKHARA i. In Pre-Islamic Times". Encyclopaedia Iranica, Vol. IV, Fasc. 5. London et al.: C. Edmund Bosworth. pp. 511–513.
