= Bidun of Bukhara =

Bukhar Khudah from unknown date to 681

Bindu of Bukhara was Bukhar Khudah (king of Bukhara) from an unknown date to 681.

Several rulers of Bukhara were known before him, however, it is not known if they were from the same dynasty. Bindu had a wife who is only known by her title of Khatun of Bukhara, with whom he had a son named Tughshada. In 681, during the Muslim conquest of Transoxiana, Bindu was killed by the Umayyad general Salm ibn Ziyad. He was succeeded by his few months old son Tughshada.

== Sources ==
- Gibb, H. A. R. (1923). The Arab Conquests in Central Asia. London: The Royal Asiatic Society. OCLC 685253133.
- Shaban, M. A. (1979). The 'Abbāsid Revolution. Cambridge: Cambridge University Press. ISBN 0-521-29534-3.
- B. A. Litvinsky, Ahmad Hasan Dani (1996). History of Civilizations of Central Asia: The crossroads of civilizations, A.D. 250 to 750. UNESCO. pp. 1–569. ISBN 9789231032110.
- Bosworth, C. Edmund. "BUKHARA ii. From the Arab Invasions to the Mongols". Encyclopaedia Iranica, Vol. IV, Fasc. 5. London et al.: C. Edmund Bosworth. pp. 513–515.
- Frye, Richard N. "BUKHARA i. In Pre-Islamic Times". Encyclopaedia Iranica, Vol. IV, Fasc. 5. London et al.: C. Edmund Bosworth. pp. 511–513.

Preceded by Makh	Bukhar Khudah ???–681	Succeeded by Tughshada
