= Muslim conquest of Transoxiana =

Part of the early Muslim conquests in Central Asia

- Part of the early Muslim conquests
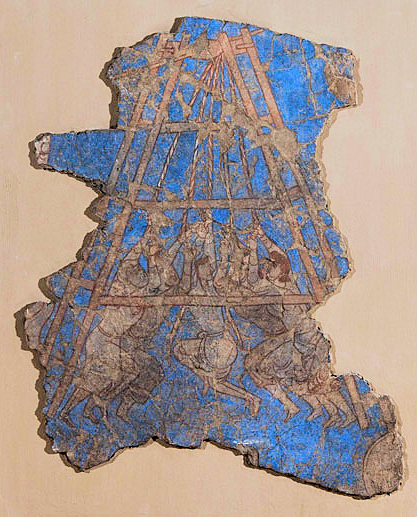
- Mural depicting Arabs besieging the city of Samarkand, which was ultimately captured in 722 – Palace of Divashtich (706–722), Panjakent
Date	651–751
Location	Central Asia
Result	Muslim victory
Territorial changes	Muslim conquest of Sogdiana, Khwarazm and Ferghana valley

Belligerents
Muslims: Rashidun Caliphate; Umayyad Caliphate; Abbasid Caliphate; Non-Muslims: Tibetan Empire	Kingdom of Khuttal; Kingdom of Chaghaniyan; Khudahs of Bukhara; Yabghus of Tokharistan; Ikhshids of Samarkand; Afrighids of Khwarezm; Afshins of Ushrusana; Second Turkic Khaganate; Kingdom of Ferghana; Kingdom of Chach; Türgesh Khaganate; Tang dynasty; Khazar Khaganate

Commanders and leaders
Abd Allah ibn Amir; Sa'id ibn Uthman; Ubayd Allah ibn Ziyad; Ahnaf ibn Qays; Qutayba ibn Muslim; Al-Hakam ibn Amr; Al-Muhallab ibn Abi Sufra; Sa'id ibn Amr al-Harashi; Nasr ibn Sayyar; Al-Saffah	Khatun of Bukhara; Gurak; Suluk X; al-Harith ibn Surayj; Nezak Tarkhan (executed); Khusrau of Khwarezm †; Qapagan Bögü Khagan; Divashtich †; Gao Xianzhi

Transoxiana and Khurasan in the 8th century

Muslims conquered Transoxiana between 651 and 751, shortly after their conquest of Persia enabled them to enter Central Asia. Relatively small-scale incursions had taken place under the Rashidun Caliphate, but it was not until after the establishment of the Umayyad Caliphate that an organized military effort was made to conquer the region that today includes all or parts of Uzbekistan, Tajikistan, Kazakhstan, and Kyrgyzstan. The campaign continued under the Abbasid Caliphate and gradually saw the Islamization of the region.

== Background: Transoxiana before the Arab conquest ==
The Arabs of the Rashidun Caliphate first reached Central Asia in the decade after their decisive victory in the Battle of Nahavand in 642, when they completed their conquest of the former Sasanian Empire by seizing Sistan and Khorasan. Marw, the capital of Khorasan, fell in 651 to Abd Allah ibn Amir, and with it the borders of the Caliphate reached the Oxus (now called the Amu Darya). The lands beyond the Oxus—Transoxiana, known simply as "the land beyond the river" (mā wara al-nahr) to the Arabs—were different to what the Arabs had encountered before: not only did they encompass a varied topography, ranging from the remote mountains of the Hindu Kush to fertile river valleys and deserts with oasis cities; they were also settled by a variety of peoples, both sedentary and nomadic, and instead of the imperial administration of the Persians, the region was divided into many small independent principalities.

Geographically, politically, and socially, Transoxiana was divided into four regions: Tokharistan on the upper Oxus valley, surrounded by the Hissar Mountains to the north and the Hindu Kush to the east and south; Sogdia to the east of the middle course of the Oxus, and around the Zarafshan river; Khwarizm or Chorasmia, on the lower Oxus and the river's confluence into the Aral Sea; and the lands north of the Hissar Mountains and along the Jaxartes river (modern Syr Darya), including Zhetysu and the Fergana Valley. As in modern times, the population belonged to two broad linguistic groups: the speakers of Iranian languages, who in the 7th century tended to be urbanized, and the Turkic peoples, who at the time were still mostly nomadic. Indeed, the history of Transoxiana had been dominated by the invasions of nomadic peoples from Central Asia. In the 2nd century BC the Yuezhi destroyed the Greco-Bactrian Kingdom and supplanted it with the Kushan Empire, under which Buddhism entered the area. The Kushans were succeeded by the Hephthalites in the early 5th century, whose dominance lasted until the rise of the First Turkic Khaganate in the mid-6th century. After the great khaganate became divided in eastern and western halves, the Western Turkic Khaganate retained its position of overlordship over the various principalities of Transoxiana, on occasion even launching raids as far as Balkh.

As the historian Hugh N. Kennedy remarks, "[Transoxiana] was a rich land, full of opportunities and wealth but defended by warlike men who valued their independence very highly". Its subjugation would prove to be the longest and hardest-fought of the early Muslim conquests, and was not completed until the Battle of Talas secured Muslim dominance over the region in 751.

=== Tokharistan ===
Tokharistan was named after the Tokharians who overran the Greco-Bactrian Kingdom in the 2nd century BC. In the works of the Arab geographers of the 9th–10th centuries, Tokharistan proper was defined as the region south of the Oxus and east of Balkh, but in its wider sense encompassed the region of the upper Oxus valley east of Balkh, up to the mountains that surrounded the valley on three sides: the Hissar Mountains in the north, beyond which lay Soghdia, and the Hindu Kush in the south and east, beyond which lay India.

When the Chinese Buddhist monk Xuanzang visited Tokharistan in 630, he found no fewer than 27 different principalities under the overall authority of Tardush Shad at Kunduz, the Tokhara Yabghu or viceroy of Tokharia. Tardush was the son of the recently deceased qaghan of the Western Turkic Khaganate or "Ten Arrows Confederation", Tonga. Following Tang China's destruction of the Khaganate in the late 650s, this shad became an independent ruler and used the title yabghu. The Tokhara Yabghus maintained some sort of suzerainty over the other principalities of Tokharistan and even beyond, up to Herat in the southeast and Kabul in the southwest, but this authority was largely nominal. The local shads, many of whom were Turkic chieftains and regional governors who had likewise seized authority after the Khaganate's collapse—were effectively independent.

Sources attest to the settlement of Turks, especially Karluks, in the region during the 7th century; the principalities of Zabulistan, the Kingdom of Kapisa, and Gandhara, which lay south of the Hindu Kush but also came under the nominal rule of the Yabghu at Kunduz, were dominated by Turks in the early 8th century.

In the northern half of the region, Upper Tokharistan, the most important principalities from east to west were Badakhshan, Khuttal, Kubadhiyan, and Chaghaniyan (Arabic Saghaniyan). South of the Oxus, in Lower Tokharistan, the important principalities were those of Guzgan, Badghis, Herat, and Bamiyan, as well as Kabul beyond the mountains. Balkh, the ancient capital of the Greco-Bactrian Kingdom and the Kushan Empire, remained the most important settlement of the region and its main religious centre, with the famous Buddhist monastery of Nawbahar attracting pilgrims from far and wide. The ruler of Balkh still bore the title of shava (king), but was little more than the lord and overseer of Nawbahar; the Sanskrit title pramukha would eventually result in his Islamicized descendants becoming known as the Barmakids, under the Abbasid caliph Harun al-Rashid (r. 786–809). The city of Talaqan, east of Balkh, was the largest city of Tokharistan proper.

=== Sogdia ===
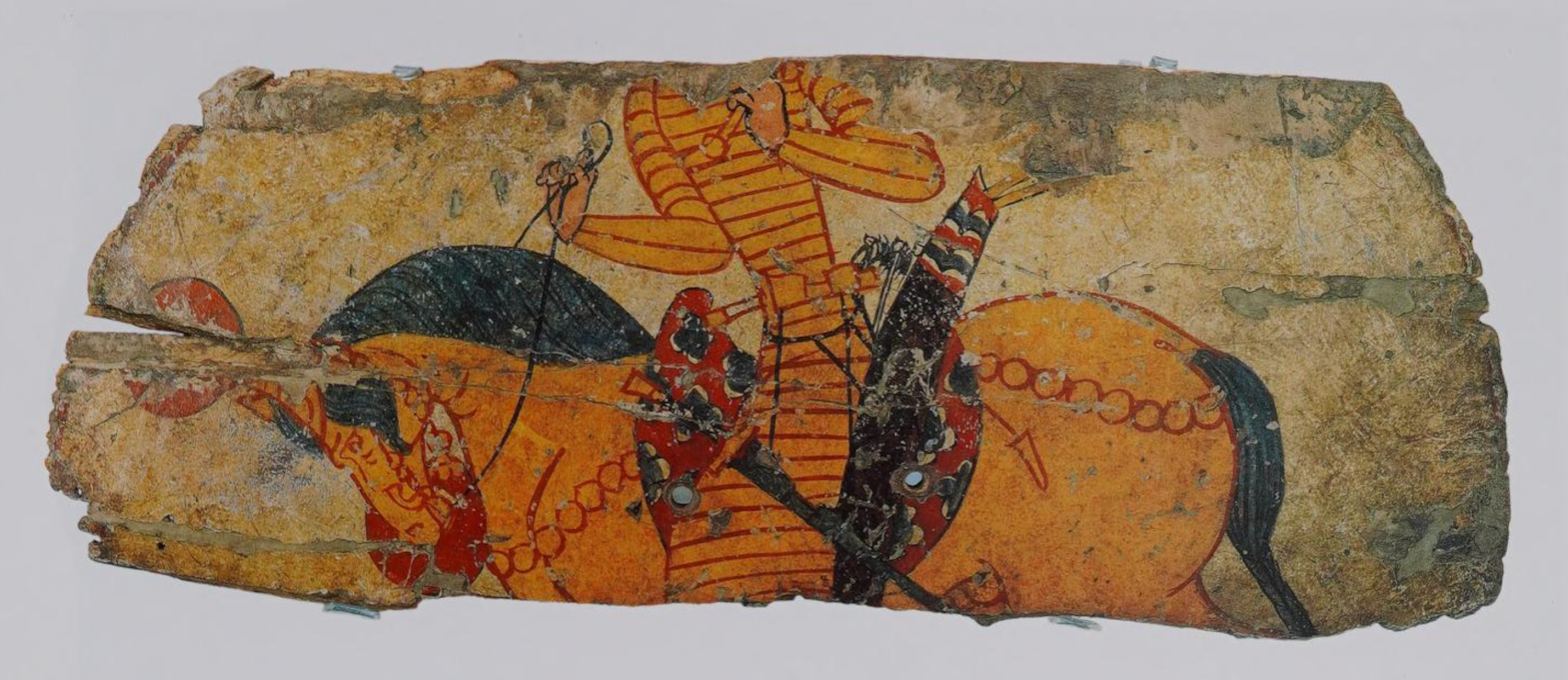
Horseman mural from Mount Mugh, circa 700 AD. Hermitage Museum

North and west of the Hissar range, along the basins of the rivers Zarafshan and Kashka Darya, lay the region of Sogdia. This was an ancient Iranian-speaking land, with its own culture, language, and script, which are well documented through archaeological discoveries and literary references. Sogdia was divided into several small independent principalities, of which the two major urban centres of Bukhara and Samarkand dominated the rest. Other important settlements were the trade towns of Baykand and Kish. The term 'Sughd' proper was sometimes more narrowly applied to the principality and environs of Samarkand.

Chinese records seem to suggest that most of the Sogdian princes belonged to branches of the same ruling house, and that the head of this house, the ruler of Samarkand, was allied by marriage to the Turkic khagan. Most of these rulers used Persian titles (khudah, shah) but some also had Turkish titles, and the ruler of Samarkand, as the pre-eminent among them, used the Sogdian title of ikhshid (as did the kings of Fargana). Rulership was hereditary, but an important role was played also by the landed gentry (dihqans) and wealthy merchants, who possessed, according to H. A. R. Gibb, "not only a large measure of independence but also on occasion the power to depose the ruling prince and elect his successor".

Sogdia escaped annexation by either the Kushan or the Sasanian empires, but came under Hephthalite and later Turkic sway in the 6th century. The Sogdians played a major role in the administration of the Turkic khaganate, and were particularly active as merchants in the so-called "Silk Road"; the Sogdian language was the early lingua franca of the Silk Road. During the 6th century, the Turks accumulated enormous quantities of silk given as tribute by the Chinese Northern dynasties, which the Sogdians endeavoured to sell west to the markets of the Byzantine Empire. The refusal of the Sasanians to let them trade or cross their lands to trade further west was one of the reasons for the Göktürk–Persian wars of the 6th–7th centuries and the annexation of the northeastern Iranian lands by the Turks.

After the collapse of the Turkic khaganates, the Sogdian princes regained their independence, recognizing only a loose suzerainty of the Chinese emperors of the Tang dynasty. Helped by the Sogdian dominance of the Eurasian trade routes, the period before the arrival of the Arabs was one of great economic and cultural flowering for Sogdia. The lively trade with and influence by the larger neighbouring civilizations meant that Sogdia was religiously varied as well; the country was largely Zoroastrian, but interspersed with native beliefs, as well as Buddhist, Manichaean and Syriac Christian communities.

=== Khwarizm ===
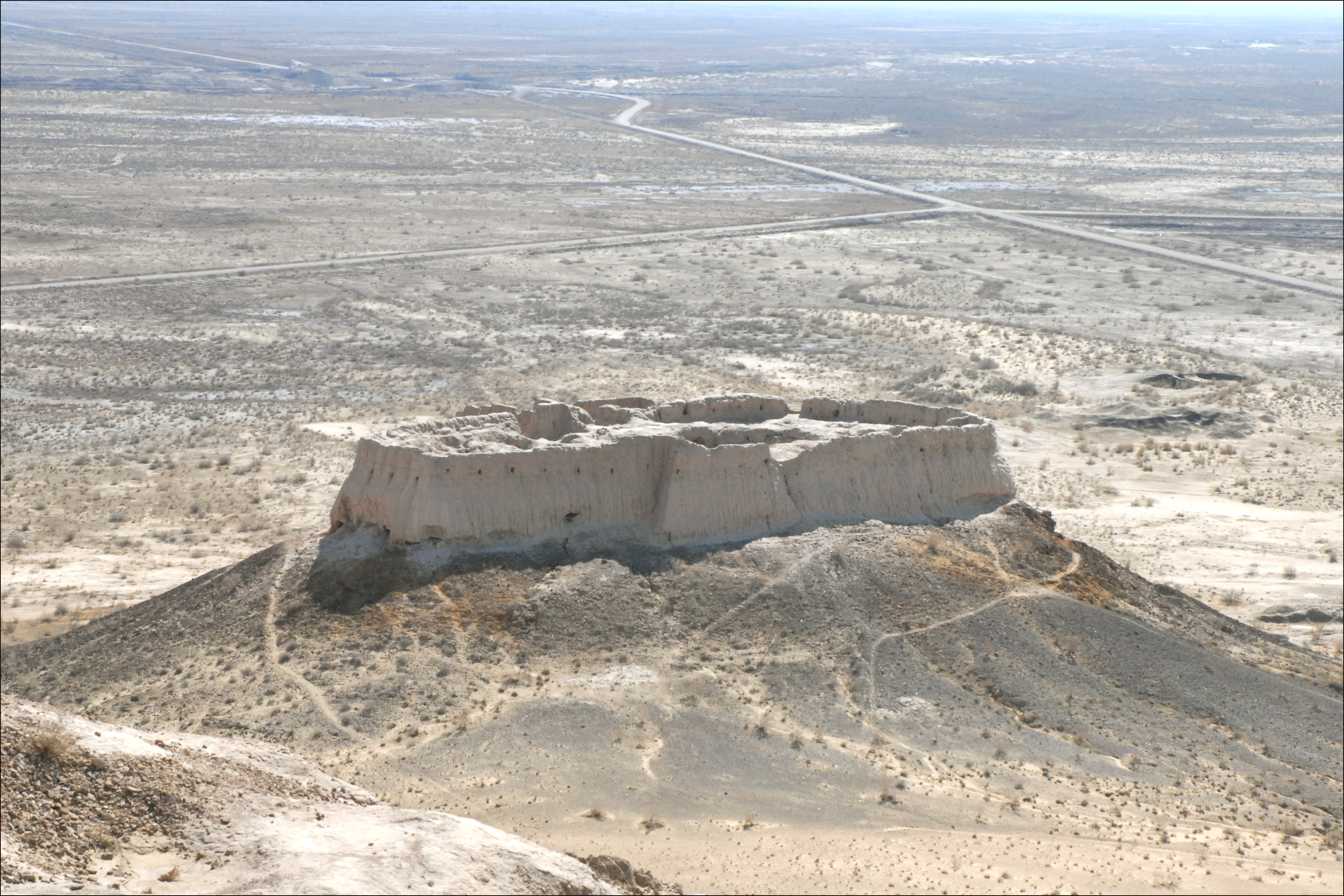
Ayaz Kala, a fortress of Khwarizm (6th to 8th century AD)

To the west of Sogdia, likewise a fertile land isolated amidst the desert expanse, lay Khwarizm. It was inhabited by a sedentary, urbanized Iranian people. The history of the area between the late 3rd century and the onset of the Muslim conquest is often unclear due to the lack of adequate literary and archaeological sources. Modern scholars dispute whether the area came under Kushan rule, notably due to the absence of any traces of Buddhism in the area and the continued prevalence of Zoroastrianism; the 10th-century Arab historian al-Tabari reports that the area was conquered by the Sasanians under Ardashir I (r. 224–242), and although later Sasanian province lists don't include Khwarizm, the area probably remained in some kind of political and cultural dependence from Sasanian Persia. It is equally unclear whether Khwarizm came under Turkic dominion in the 6th–7th centuries. The region was ruled by the Khwarizmshah, but numismatic evidence suggests the existence of autonomous or wholly independent minor rulers in the 7th–8th century. Society was feudal, following the norms found elsewhere in the Iranian world at the time. From the early 4th century, Khwarizm was ruled by the native Afrighid dynasty, which is known through coins and the—largely mythical—narrative of the 11th-century Khwarezmian scholar al-Biruni.

=== Middle Jaxartes and the Fergana Valley ===
To the north and east of Sogdia stretched the so-called "Hungry Steppe", an expanse of c. 160 kilometres (99 mi), which gave way to the fertile regions around the river Jaxartes. The Jaxartes was smaller than the Oxus and easily fordable. Immediately northeast of Sogdia, between the Hissar mountains and the middle course of the Jaxartes, lay the principality of Ustrushana, which was often considered part of Sogdia and preserved close ethnic and cultural ties with the Sogdian principalities. From its capital of Bunjikat, Usrushana was ruled by a series of kings bearing the title of afshin, nominally under Hephthalite and later Western Turkic suzerainty but practically autonomous. East of Usrushana lay the small principality of Khujand, extending on both banks of the Jaxartes and made prosperous from agriculture, minerals, and trade.

North of the Jaxartes lay the principalities of Chach (Ar. Shash, modern Tashkent) and Ilak. They too were under Hephthalite and later Turkic suzerainty, but their rulers—the tudun of Chach and the dihqan of Ilak—were practically autonomous. While inhabited by a mostly Iranian-speaking, Zoroastrian population, large-scale Turkic settlement occurred in the 6th–7th centuries, including, in the 7th century, of Türgesh nomads. Although smaller than Usrushana, the principalities were prosperous: Chach had much arable land and livestock, while Ilak had mines and livestock, and both profited from their location in the caravan trade routes with China.

East of Usrushana, Khujand, and Chach lay the large Fergana Valley, a fertile and wealthy region surrounded by mountains. To its south it was bordered by the Tien Shan Mountains, behind which lay Kashgar and the other city-states of the Tarim Basin, the westernmost outposts of the Chinese Empire. Fergana was ruled by its own dynasty, with the title of ikhshid and its capital at Akhsikath, but its internal history is mostly unknown and what little survives indicates that it was often fragmented among rival rulers. The local population was an amalgam that included Sogdian and Hepthalite elements, and spoke its own peculiar Iranian language. Like its western neighbours, Fergana experienced increasing Turkic settlement in the 6th–7th centuries.

== Start of the Arab conquest ==
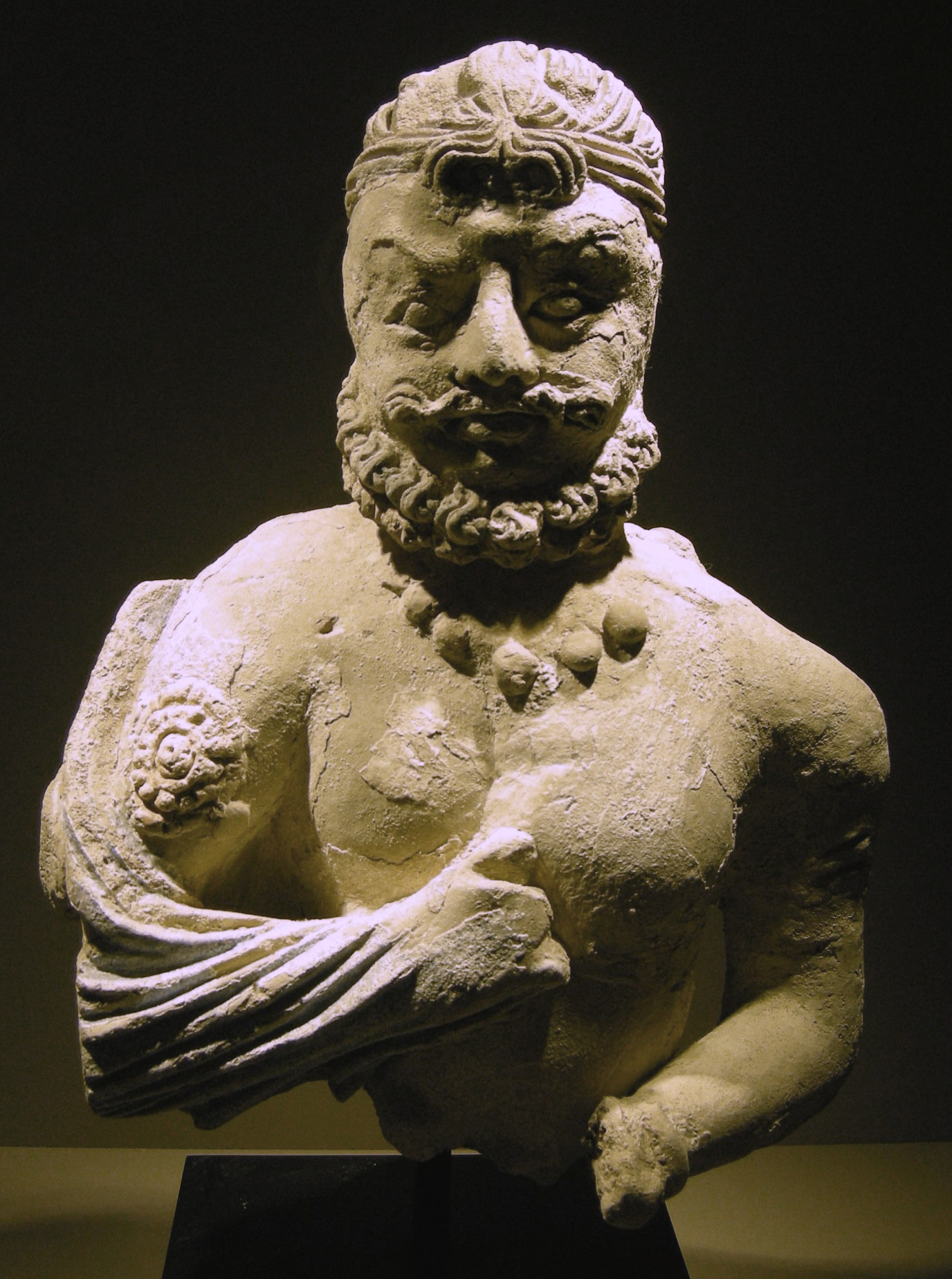
Male bust from Tokharistan, 7th/8th century AD

Although the Arab sources give the impression that the Arabs began their conquest of the region in the 650s, in reality most of the early warfare in the area were little more than raids aiming at seizing booty and extracting tribute. Indeed, Arab presence was limited to a small garrison at Marw, and armies were sent by the governors of Iraq every year to raid and plunder the native principalities. A common feature of the narratives is the agreement of tribute by the various cities, whether in money or measures of wheat and barley.

=== First Muslim incursions, 651–658 ===
Pursuing the Sasanian shah, Yazdegerd III, the Arabs under Abdallah ibn Amir and his lieutenant, Ahnaf ibn Qais, entered Khorasan in 651. Abandoned by his local governors, who resented his overbearing demands and harboured designs for autonomy, Yazdegerd was killed by a local peasant. The local Persian resistance was defeated by the Arabs, despite the intervention of the Hephthalites of Herat. The Arabs imposed tribute on the Persian governors and cities of Khorasan, before marching on Herat, whose ruler likewise agreed to the payment of tribute. Ahnaf was then sent to invade Tokharistan in 652 with 4,000 Arabs and 1,000 Iranian converts (mawali). The city of Marw al-Rudh was forced to capitulate and become a tributary ally of the Arabs. When marching against Lower Tokharistan, Ahnaf was opposed by the united forces of the local princes, reportedly 30,000 men, and suffered heavy losses. A second expedition under al-Aqra ibn Habis was able to defeat the prince of Juzjan, and occupy Juzjan, Faryab, Talaqan, and Balkh. Detachments of Arabs plundered far and wide, some reaching as far as Khwarizm.

With the onset of winter, Ibn Amir left only 4,000 men at Marw, and returned to his base in Iraq. In 654, the Arabs reportedly raided the town of Mayamurgh in Sogdia, but their position was shaky: the Arab garrisons were very small, and the loyalty of the local princes dubious. As the historian Michael G. Morony emphasizes, their promises of tribute were more a "temporary expedient to secure their own positions, sometimes, against local rivals, with Muslim military backing", and not a firm commitment to the Arab cause. Furthermore, until the early 8th century, Muslim forces in the region were usually outnumbered by those of the native rulers; while they sufficed to subdue individual cities and force them to pay tribute, the Arab armies were unable to impose permanent control on the native principalities. As a result, very soon after Ibn Amir's departure, the local population, led by a certain Qarin (possibly a member of the House of Karen), rose in revolt. Ibn Amir reacted with alacrity, sending generals to the region who scored some success—the rebel leader Qarin was captured or killed and Muslim armies campaigned as far as Bust and Zabul in what is now southern Afghanistan. Nevertheless, with the outbreak of the First Fitna (656–661), Arab authority collapsed across Khorasan. According to Chinese sources, the princes of Tokharistan restored Yazdegerd III's son Peroz as titular king of Persia for a time. Preoccupied with their civil war the Arabs were unable to react, although raiding expeditions continue to be recorded in 655–658.

=== Second wave of Muslim attacks, 661–683 ===
After the end of the civil war, Abdallah ibn Amir was again entrusted with restoring Muslim control over Khorasan by the new Umayyad Caliphate. The exact events of the next few years are unclear as the historical traditions confuse them with Ibn Amir's original conquest of the area, but what information there is, mostly from Arab tribal accounts, suggests occasional fierce resistance and rebellions, leading to acts like the destruction of the Nawbahar stupa by Ibn Amir's deputy, Qays ibn al-Haytham al-Sulami. Herat, Pushang, and Badghis are reported to have returned to paying tribute by 663. It was not until the appointment of Ziyad ibn Abi Sufyan to the government of Iraq and the eastern Caliphate that the Arabs undertook a systematic pacification campaign in Khorasan. From 667 until he died in 670, Ziyad's deputy in Khorasan, al-Hakam ibn Amr al-Ghifari, led a series of campaigns in Tokharistan, which saw Arab armies crossing the Oxus into Chaghaniyan in the process. Peroz was evicted and once again fled to China. Al-Hakam's death was followed by another large-scale uprising, but his successor, Rabi ibn Ziyad al-Harithi, took Balkh and defeated a revolt in Quhistan, before crossing the Oxus to invade Chaghaniyan. Other Arab forces secured the crossing points of Zamm and Amul further west, while the Arab sources mention a conquest of Khwarizm simultaneously.

More importantly for the future of Muslim presence in the region, in 671 Ziyad ibn Abi Sufyan settled 50,000 warriors, drawn from the Iraqi garrison cities of Basra and Kufa, with their families in Marw and other cities of the region, such as Nishapur, Abiward, Sarakhs and Herat. This move not only immensely bolstered the Muslim element and rule in Khorasan but also provided the forces necessary for future expansion into Transoxiana. While previously annual expeditions had to be mustered and sent from Iraq, now a large pool of manpower was available on the very frontier of the caliphate, eager to make their fortune in wars of conquest. At the same time, the Iraqi tribes brought with them a strong regional identity and their rivalries, notably the Qays–Yaman factionalism, which in Khorasan came to exceed in ferocity the rivalries seen in Iraq, and repeatedly placed Arab Muslim rule of the region at risk of collapse.

Main polities in Asia in c. 720

When Ziyad died, his policies were continued by his son, Ubayd Allah ibn Ziyad, appointed governor of Khorasan, who arrived in Marw in autumn 673. In the following spring, Ubayd Allah crossed the Oxus and invaded the principality of Bukhara, which at the time was led by the queen mother or khatun, a Turkic title meaning "lady", as regent for her infant son Tughshada. The Arabs achieved their first success near the town of Baykand before marching on to Bukhara itself. The local historical tradition records that the Arabs besieged Bukhara and that the Turks were called for help. This is missing in the Arab sources, stating that the Arabs won a great victory over the Bukharans. Following a common practice at the time, Ubayd Allah recruited 2000 captives, all "skillful archers", as his personal guard. Bukhara acknowledged some form of Arab suzerainty and was obliged to pay a tribute of a million silver dirhams.

Ubayd Allah's success was not followed up by his successors, Aslam ibn Zur'a and Abd al-Rahman ibn Ziyad, apart from launching summer raids across the Oxus. Only during the brief governorship of Sa'id ibn Uthman in 676 did the Arabs launch a major expedition into Sogdia. According to al-Baladhuri and Narshakhi, Sa'id defeated a local coalition comprising the cities of Kish, Nasaf, Bukhara, and the Turks, compelled the Khatun to re-affirm Bukhara's allegiance to the Caliphate, and then marched onto Samarkand, which he besieged and captured after three days. He then took young nobles (variously given as 40, 50 or 80) as hostages, who were later executed at Medina, and on his return journey captured Tirmidh on the Oxus and received the surrender of the prince of Khuttal. In 681, another son of Ziyad, Salm, was appointed as governor of Khorasan. Eager to emulate his brother, he recruited in Basra for an offensive across the Oxus, including such renowned warriors as Abd Allah ibn Khazim al-Sulami and al-Muhallab ibn Abi Sufra. Salm began a series of raids over the river, which ranged as far as Shash and Khwarizm (imposing a tribute of 400,000 dirhams on the region), and again subdued Bukhara, which had rebelled again in the meantime. The timing was favourable for the Arabs, since the Transoxianan princes could expect little support from elsewhere: the Khaganate had been destroyed, and the power of the nascent Tibetan Empire kept Chinese ambitions in Central Asia in check. Salm's plans, however, were Arab conquests, interrupted by the outbreak of a new civil war, the Second Fitna (683–692).

=== Tribal turmoil in Khorasan, 683–704 ===
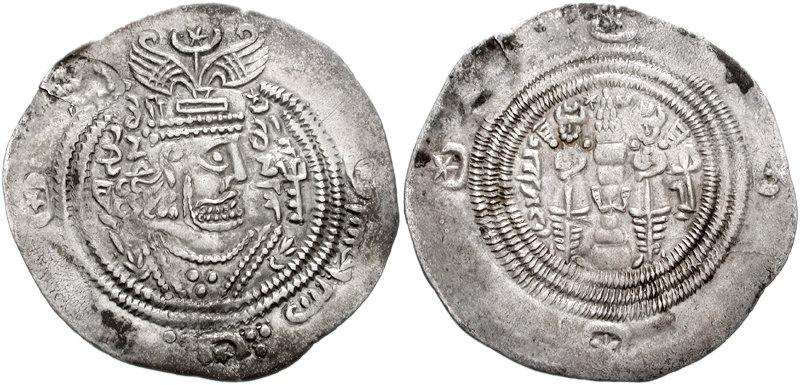
Arab–Sasanian silver dirham, minted in 683/84 in the name of Abd Allah ibn Khazim

The Second Fitna put an end to Muslim expansion in Central Asia for a generation. In the absence of centrally-appointed governors, Khorasan was engulfed by intertribal warfare among the Arab settlers, while local princes withheld tribute and the Hephthalite princes even launched raids into Khorasan. After massacring some 8,000 of his rivals from the Rabi'a and Bakr ibn Wa'il tribes, the Mudari leader Abd Allah ibn Khazim al-Sulami established himself as the de facto ruler of Khorasan until 691, when the victorious Umayyads encouraged his rivals to revolt, leading to his death. The remnants of Abd Allah's followers fled to the fortress town of Tirmidh on the Oxus, where Abd Allah's son, Musa, had established himself with a band of adventurers as a quasi-independent ruler.

Umayya ibn Abdallah ibn Khalid ibn Asid, a prince of the Umayyad dynasty, was appointed as the new governor in 691, and managed to restore Lower Tokharistan to at least nominal Arab suzerainty. His attempt to expel Musa from Tirmidh, however, failed, although the Arab attack was joined by a simultaneous Turkic one. The restiveness of the Arabs of Khorasan was to be a major problem for the Umayyad governors. On the one hand, in a bid to keep the Arab settlers occupied and placate them with the prospect of plunder, they sought to conquer territory across the Oxus, but on the other, the volatile tribal politics doomed such efforts. Thus in 696, Umayya was abandoned beyond the Oxus by his second-in-command, who tried to seize control of Marw, and had to conclude a quick and humiliating peace with the Bukharans after being encircled and almost destroyed. Umayya also faced the dissatisfaction of the Iranian mawali, who despite being converts to Islam were obliged to pay the kharaj tax. As a result, Khorasan was attached to the eastern viceroyalty of the powerful governor of Iraq, al-Hajjaj ibn Yusuf, who appointed the famous Azdi warrior-leader al-Muhallab ibn Abi Sufra as his governor in the province. His campaigns were not much more successful: he blockaded Kish for two years, but failed to conquer it and had to satisfy himself with the extraction of tribute from the city. At the same time, his sons, Yazid and Habib, led secondary expeditions against Khuttal and Rabinjan, which also failed to achieve much.

After al-Muhallab's death in 702, he was succeeded by his son Yazid, who did not launch any campaigns during his two-year governorship, apart from a raid into Khwarizm. Worse, Yazid's championing of his own tribe, the Azd, alienated many among the other Arab tribes; and his mistreatment of the chief mawali leaders, Hurayth and Thabit ibn Qutba, provoked their defection to Musa. The latter now became a rallying figure for opposition to Umayyad rule: he was joined by aristocratic Iranian mawali, disaffected Arabs from Khorasan, 8,000 refugees from Ibn al-Ash'ath's failed anti-Umayyad uprising in Iraq, and gained the support of the prince of Chaghaniyan and Nezak Tarkhan of Badghis. Even Narsieh, a son of Peroz and purported heir to the Sasanian crown, appeared in Tokharistan. Musa had to tread a careful balance between his Iranian supporters, who favoured an invasion of Khorasan and the expulsion of the Arabs, and his Arab followers, who feared losing their eminent status in the event of an Iranian restoration and preferred supplanting Umayyad authority with their own. As a result Musa limited himself to the expulsion of the Umayyad governors from Chaghaniyan and Lower Tokharistan, which was apparently swiftly and easily accomplished.

Musa's nascent independent rule faltered, however, on the dissensions between Arabs and Iranians. Open conflict broke out when Musa's Iranian followers, led by Thabit ibn Qutba, rebelled, with the backing of the native princes. While Musa prevailed over his erstwhile companions, this was a hollow victory, as it estranged the cause of the Arabs of Tirmidh from the native princes. The persistent disunity of the Transoxianian princes, riven by their own feuds, and failing to recognize the still persistent danger of an Arab conquest, would be suitably exploited by the Umayyad governors. Already in 704, the Umayyad commander Uthman ibn Mas'ud was able to ally with some native princes and defeat and kill Musa, capturing Tirmidh.

== Later conquests and consolidation of Arab rule ==
=== Conquests of Qutayba ibn Muslim ===
Qutayba's appointment marked a seminal moment in the history of the Muslim conquest of Central Asia. During his ten-year tenure, he was able to consolidate the political situation in Khorasan, and at the same time pursue an active policy of expansion into Transoxiana. The chief reasons for his success were his skill as an organizer, the unfailing support of al-Hajjaj, and Qutayba's willingness to work with and integrate the local population into the Umayyad administration. As an exclusive warrior caste, the Arab settlers of Khorasan had been jealous of their privileges, and for a long time limited the number of natives allowed to take up arms, apart from the ad hoc forces provided by allied native rulers. It is only from the time of Qutayba that larger bodies of native troops, whether mawali converts or non-Muslims, begin to appear in the sources. This mass recruitment of local troops not only increased the manpower pool available, giving the Umayyad armies a significant numerical advantage, but also kept the native soldiery occupied far from their homes and employed for the Arabs' benefit, rather than posing a potential threat in their rear. A significant factor, that eased Qutayba's relations with the Khorasani Arabs, was his descent from the minor tribe of Bahila: Qutayba aroused far less jealousy from the other Arab tribes of Khorasan, and had to satisfy far fewer demands from his fellow Bahilis. The international situation was also favourable to Qutayba. Tang China was weakened and her influence withdrawn from Central Asia, while the Second Turkic Khaganate (682–744) was embroiled in warfare with the Türgesh Khaganate (699–766).

==== Conquest of Tokharistan and Bukhara, 705–710 ====
Qutayba began his tenure by recovering Balkh in spring 705, thereby bringing Lower Tokharistan to heel. This was followed by the submission of the local princes in the upper Oxus valley, most notably of Tish, prince of Chaghaniyan, and the negotiated surrender of Nezak of Badghis. Still unsure of Nezak's loyalty, Qutayba required him to accompany him in his expeditions.

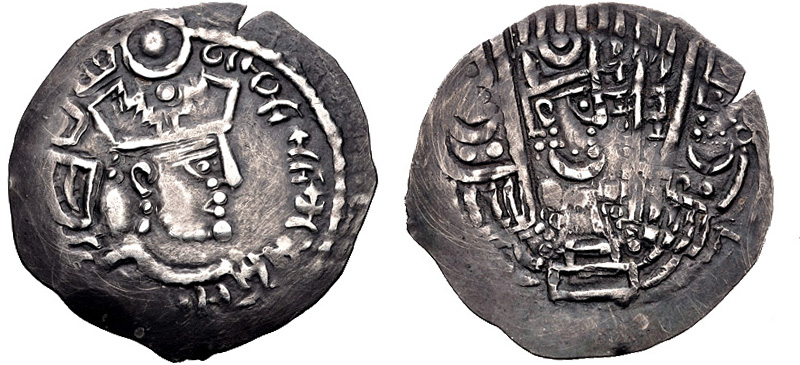
Coin of Khunuk Khudah

In 706–709, Qutayba occupied himself with the long and bloody conquest of the kingdom of Bukhara. The Bukharan realm was at the time weakened by civil war: royal power had been weakened in favour of ambitious nobles during the minority of King Tughshada and the regency of the Khatun. Bukhara itself had fallen under the rule of the Wardan Khudah, lord of Wardana, and another magnate, Khunuk Khudah, who had usurped the title of king of Bukhara (Bukhar Khudah). Taking advantage of the conflict, Qutayba was able to easily capture Baykand. When the city rebelled, shortly after, he proceeded to punish it in exemplary fashion: men of fighting age were executed, the women and children sold off as slaves, and enormous booty amassed, especially in high-quality armour and weapons, which was used to equip the Arab army.

The brutal treatment of Baykand shocked the region: the Sogdians patched up their quarrels and the Sogdian princes of Kish and Nasaf united behind the Wardan Khudah. In the campaigns of 707 and 708, Qutayba was able to make little headway against the united Sogdian opposition, despite heavy fighting. As a result, al-Hajjaj drew up a new plan for his subordinate for the 709 campaigning season: the Arabs launched a direct attack on Bukhara, which caught the Sogdian alliance—possibly weakened by the death of its leader, the Wardan Khudah—by surprise. The city was taken by storm, a tribute of 200,000 dirhams imposed, and an Arab garrison installed in the citadel. In the immediate aftermath, Tarkhun, the ruler of Samarkand, sent envoys to Qutayba and became a tributary vassal to the Caliphate. Qutayba was represented in these negotiations by the commander of his recently raised Iranian corps, Hayyan al-Nabafi.

The Arab successes worried Nezak, who in the autumn of 709 escaped the Arab camp and raised Lower Tokharistan in revolt: while the ruler of Chaghaniyan apparently refused to join, the princes of Talaqan and Faryab, and the city of Balkh, did, as did the Yabghu, still the nominal suzerain of the entire region. The year was too advanced for a direct confrontation and the Muslim levy-based army mostly disbanded, but Qutayba sent his brother Abd al-Rahman with the 12,000 men of the Marw garrison to Balkh, thus discouraging more native princes from joining the uprising. Come spring, Abd al-Rahman was able to re-establish Muslim control over Tokharistan almost without bloodshed. Most of the rebel rulers fled or capitulated; Nezak was executed, and the Yabghu Ashina Dunili was sent to Damascus as a hostage. Lower Tokharistan was more firmly incorporated into the Caliphate, as Arab district representatives were appointed alongside the local princes, who were gradually relegated to secondary positions. Abd al-Rahman was installed with a garrison near Balkh to oversee the affairs of the province. From this point on, Balkh began developing "as a centre of Arab power and Islamic culture", in the words of C. E. Bosworth; within a generation, it was Islamicized to the extent of briefly replacing Marw as the provincial capital of Khurasan.

A subsequent revolt by the king of Shuman and Akharun was also quickly suppressed, with the king killed in battle and his men massacred; this marked the start of the slide to obscurity for both fortresses. Qutayba then marched west over the Iron Gate, taking Kish and Nasaf and visiting Bukhara, where he settled relations between the Arabs and the locals, installed Tughshada in the position of Bukhar Khudah and established an Arab military colony in the city. Later, in 712/13, Qutayba built a mosque in the city's citadel, but although the Arab authorities encouraged the conversion of the native population by paying them to attend prayers, Islamization proceeded slowly.

=== Umayyad–Türgesh wars ===
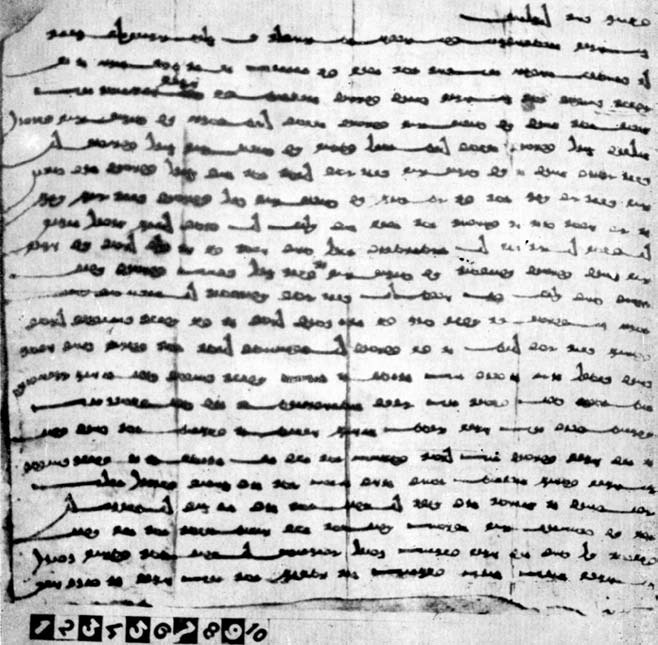
Letter of an Arab Emir to Devashtich, found in Mount Mugh

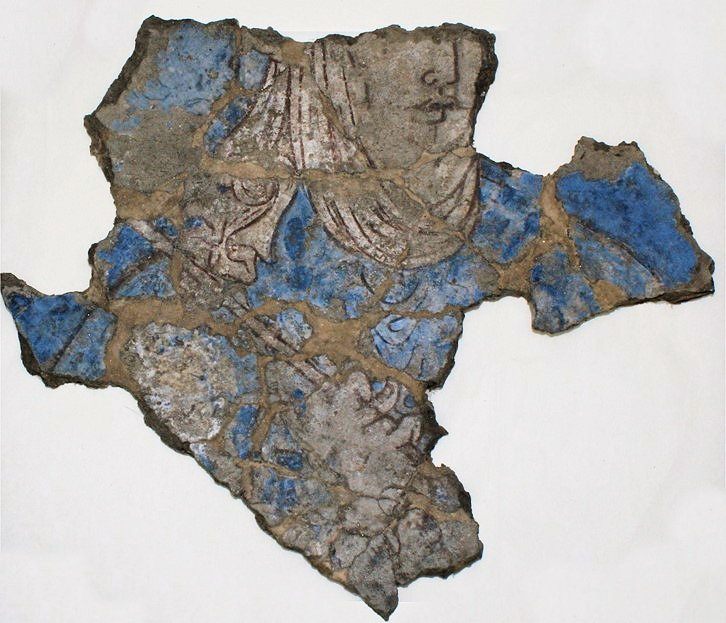
Wealthy Arab, Palace of Devashtich, Penjikent murals

The larger part of Transoxiana was finally conquered by the Umayyad leader Qutayba ibn Muslim in the reign of al-Walid I (r. 705–715). The loyalties of Transoxiana's native Iranian and Turkic populations and those of their autonomous local sovereigns remained questionable, as demonstrated in 719, when the Transoxianian sovereigns sent a petition to the Chinese and their Turgesh overlords for military aid against the Caliphate's governors.

Qutayba's campaigns have been mixed up with a diplomatic mission. They sent to China in chronicles written by Arabs. Documents in Chinese give 713 as the year the Arab diplomatic delegation was sent. China was asked for help by Shah's Prince against Qutayba.

The Turgesh responded by launching a series of attacks against the Muslims in Transoxiana, beginning in 720. These incursions were coupled with uprisings against the Caliphate among the local Sogdians. The Umayyad governor of Khurasan, Sa'id ibn Amr al-Harashi, harshly suppressed the unrest and restored the Muslim position almost to what it had been during the time of Qutayba, except for the Ferghana Valley, control over which was lost.

The Chinese and Turks were reported to have come to aid the Sogdians in their war against the Arabs which raised the hopes of Divashtich. After the Arabs seized Penjikent, the rebel leader Divashtich retreated to his fortress on Mount Mugh. Archives in the Sogdian language found at Divashtich's fortress reveal his precarious position and the events leading up to his capture. After Divashtich's capture, the governor of Khurasan, Said al-Harashi, ordered his crucifixion on a na'us (burial mound).

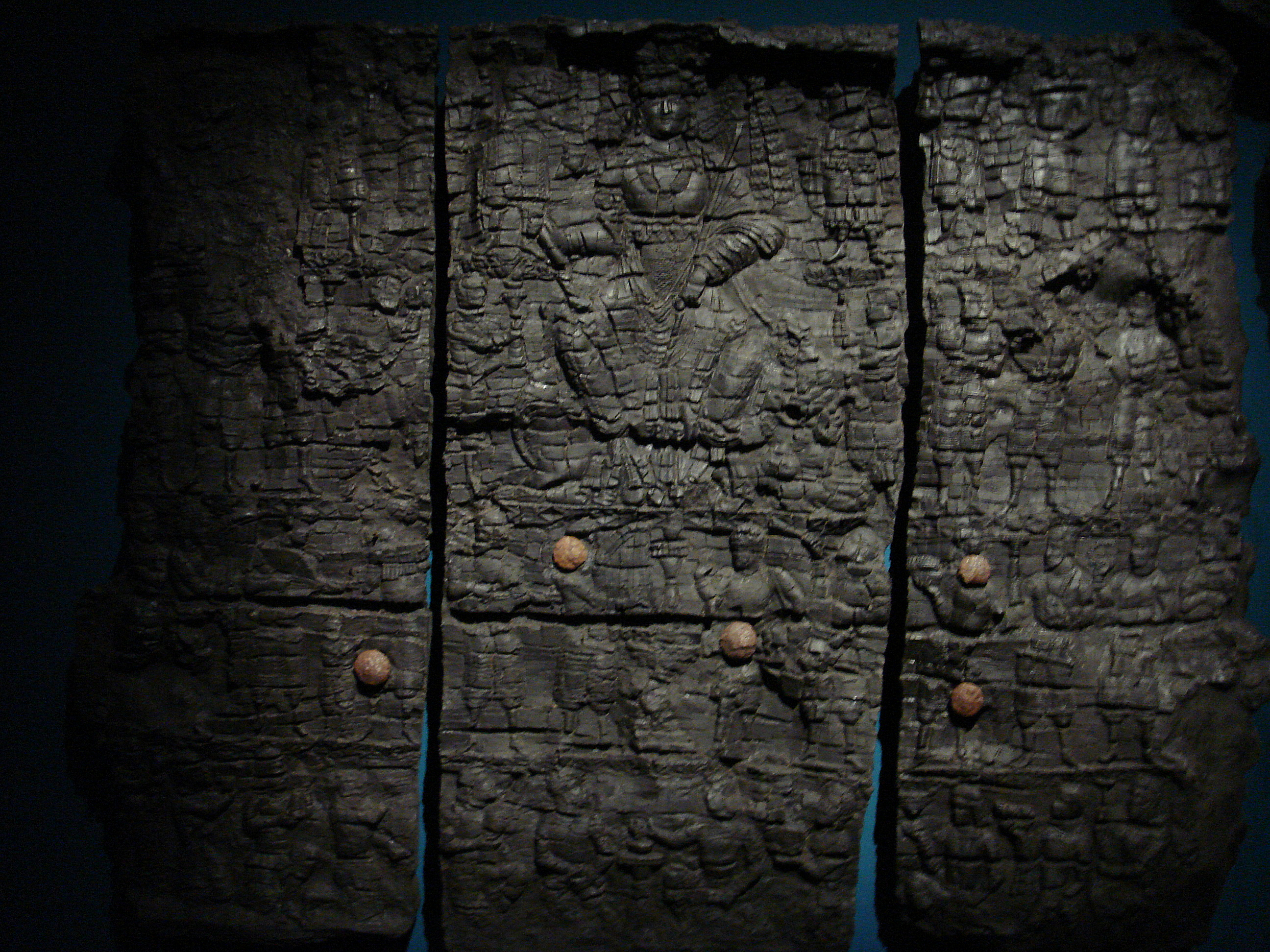
A calcinated wooden gate from the fortress of Kafir-kala, near Samarkand, which was probably destroyed by Islamic forces in 712 AD. It features adorations scenes of the Goddess Nana.

Samarkand, Bukhara and Paikent fell to Qutayba ibn Muslim. In response, the Arabs were almost beaten back by the Turgesh, who were partners with the Sogdians. Sulaiman most likely executed Qutayba, who, after seizing Samarkand and Bukhara, had crushed Sassanian remnants and had Khorezmian scholars slaughtered. Ferghana, Khojand and Chach had fallen to Qutayba.

In 721, Turgesh forces, led by Kül Chor, defeated the Caliphate army commanded by Sa'id ibn Abdu'l-Aziz near Samarkand. Sa'id's successor, Al-Kharashi, massacred Turks and Sogdian refugees in Khujand, causing an influx of refugees towards the Turgesh. In 724, Caliph Hisham sent a new governor to Khurasan, Muslim ibn Sa'id, with orders to crush the "Turks" once and for all, but, confronted by Suluk, Muslim hardly managed to reach Samarkand with a handful of survivors after the so-called "Day of Thirst".

Samarkand was taken by Qutayba after they achieved victory over the army of the Eastern Turks under Kul Tegin Qapaghan Qaghan came to assist against the Arabs after his vassal, the Tashkent King, received plea from the Samarkand Prince Ghurak against the Arab attack by Qutayba bin Muslim.

Qutayba's Muslims obliterated and triumphed over the union of several Ferghana states as fierce fighting took place in Sogdian Samarkand and Khorezm against Qutayba ibn Muslim. An easier time was had in the conquest of Bukhara. Under Ghurak, Sogdian Samarkand was forced to capitulate to the joint Arab-Khwarazmian and Bukharan forces of Qutayba. The obliteration of idols was ordered by Qutayba along with the construction of a Mosque, 30,000 slaves and 2,200,000 dirhams. Dewashtich's uprising was an example of anti Islamification sentiment felt after the conquest of the region by the Arabs.

A string of subsequent appointees of Hisham were defeated by Suluk, who in 728 took Bukhara and later on still inflicted tactical defeats such as the Battle of the Defile upon the Arabs. The Turgesh state was at its apex, controlling Sogdiana and the Ferghana Valley. By 732, two large Arab expeditions to Samarkand managed, if with heavy losses, to reestablish Caliphal authority in the area; Suluk renounced his ambitions over Samarkand and abandoned Bukhara, withdrawing north.

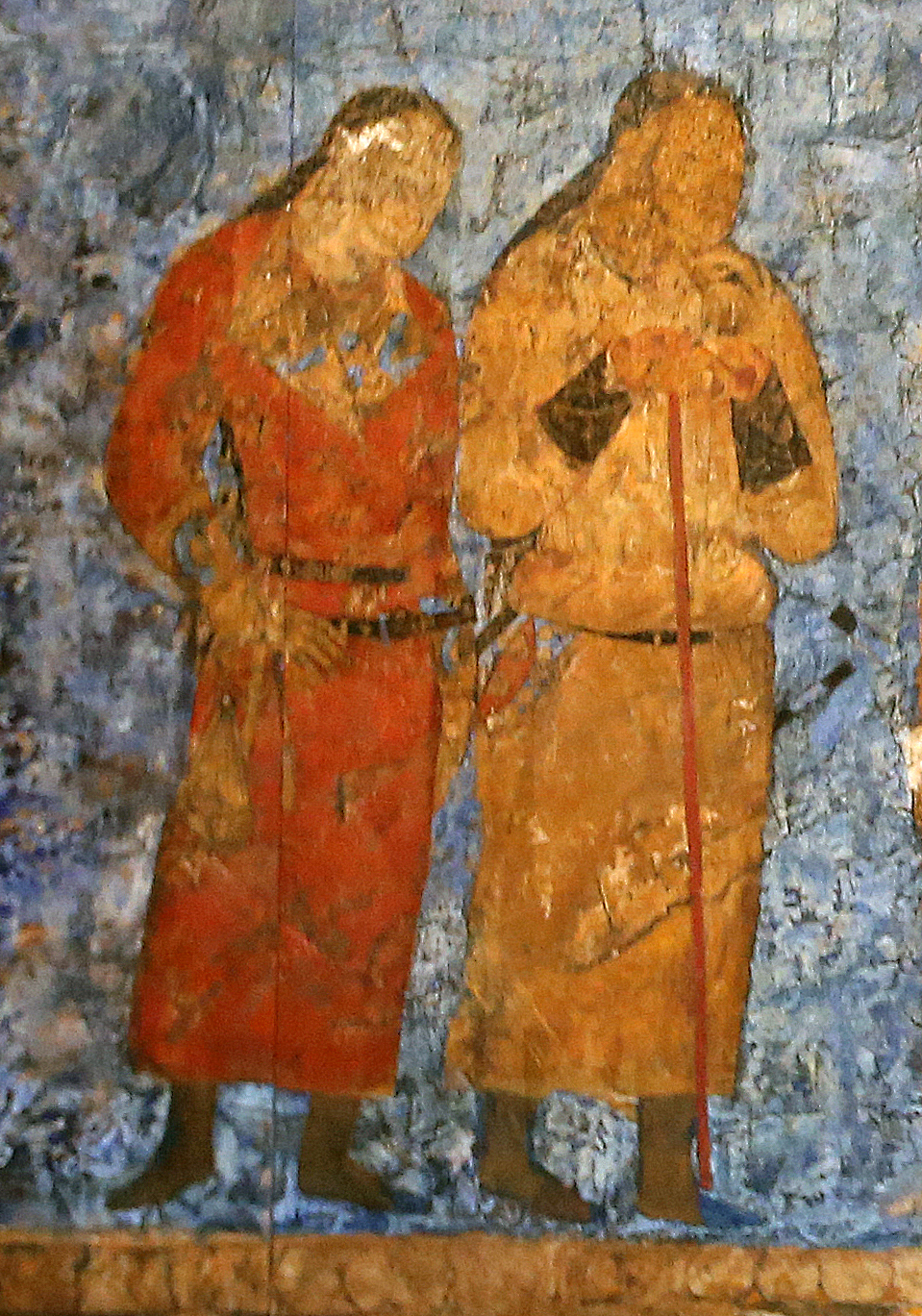
Turkish officers during an audience with king Varkhuman of Samarkand. 648–651 AD, Afrasiyab murals, Samarkand. They are recognizable by their long plaits.

In 734, an early Abbasid follower, al-Harith ibn Surayj, rose in revolt against Umayyad rule and took Balkh and Marv before defecting to the Turgesh three years later, defeated. In winter 737, Suluk along with his allies al-Harith, Gurak (a Turco-Sogdian leader) and men from Usrushana, Tashkent and Khuttal launched a final offensive. He entered Jowzjan but was defeated by the Umayyad governor Asad at the Battle of Kharistan. Next year, Suluk was murdered by his general Kül-chor with Chinese support. Taking advantage of his death, Nasr recovered most of Transoxiana by 743.

Much of the culture and heritage of the Sogdians was lost due to the war. Geographic names used by Muslims contained reminders of the Sogdians. The role of lingua franca that Sogdian originally played was succeeded by Persian after the arrival of Islam.

=== Umayyad–Tang wars ===
Beyond the Oxus River, Qutayba conquered the Bukharan territories of Numushkat and Ramithna in 707 CE (88 AH). But shortly after, he faced a coalition force of roughly 200,000 soldiers from Ferghana and Sogdiana, led by Kur Maghayun, who the sources identify as the Chinese emperor's nephew. a heavy battle occurred. Qutayba managed to defeat the coalition army in combat, driving its commander to retreat, and then led his army back to his base at Merv.

Qutayba is reported to have advanced as far as Kashgar, where he captured the city and fought the Chinese forces, took spoils and captives, and pushed deep into Chinese territory. the Tang emperor sent letter requesting to negotiate with Qutayba. Qutayba sent a Muslim delegation to negotiate with the emperor, resulting in an agreement between the Arabs and the Chinese under which the Muslims would withdraw from the city in exchange for tribute and valuable gifts from the Tang court. Modern historians, however, dismiss this claim.

The Arab Umayyad Caliphate in 715 AD deposed Ikhshid, the king the Fergana Valley, and installed a new king Alutar on the throne. The deposed king fled to Kucha (seat of Anxi Protectorate), and sought Chinese intervention. The Chinese sent 10,000 troops under Zhang Xiaosong to Ferghana. He defeated Alutar and the Arab occupation force at Namangan and reinstalled Ikhshid on the throne.

General Tang Jiahui led the Chinese to defeat the following Arab-Tibetan attack in the Battle of Aksu (717). The attack on Aksu was joined by Turgesh Khan Suluk. Both Uch Turfan and Aksu were attacked by the Turgesh, Arab, and Tibetan force on 15 August 717. Qarluqs serving under Chinese command, under Arsila Xian, a Western Turkic Qaghan serving under the Chinese Assistant Grand Protector General Tang Jiahui defeated the attack. Al-Yashkuri (the Arab commander) and his army fled to Tashkent after they were defeated.

==== Battle of Talas ====
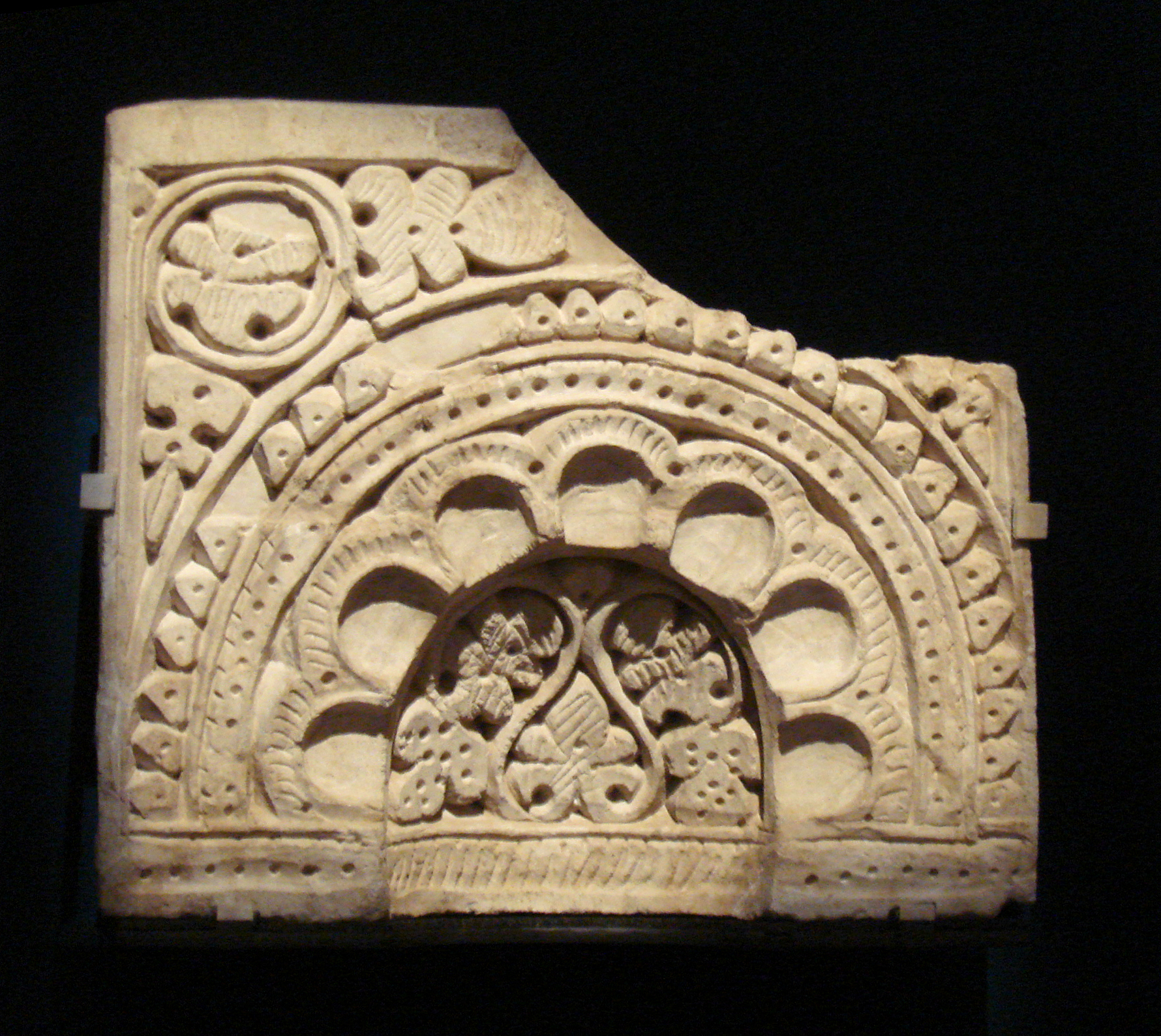
Decorated niche from the Abbasid mosque of Afrasiab, Samarkand in Sogdia, 750-825 AD

The fall of the Umayyad Caliphate in 750, combined with Emperor Xuanzong's aggressive expansion policy, enabled Tang to reassert its influence in Transoxania and become the predominant power in Chinese Turkestan. However, this resurgence ended suddenly at the Battle of Talas in 751, which became the last major Arab victory in Central Asia. The Tibetan Empire was allied to the Arabs during the battle against the Chinese Tang dynasty.

The Tang army led by Gao Xianzhi was defeated by the Abbasid army under Ziyad ibn Salih near present-day Tashkent. Sources differ on the force numbers and casualties with army sizes ranging from 10,000 to 100,000 for the Chinese side and 30,000 to 200,000 for the Abbasid side, although the larger numbers for both are likely exaggerated. Chinese sources state that the Tang army suffered 20,000 to 30,000 casualties while Arab sources state that 50,000 Tang soldiers were killed and 20,000 were taken captive. This defeat marked the end of Tang westward expansion in Transoxiana.The Abbasids then consolidated their rule in Transoxania.

Islam did not widely spread until the Abbasid rule. Samarra, Baghdad, Nishapur and Merv were destinations for Sogdians who worked for the Abbasids and became Muslims. The coming to power of the Abbasids resulted in the local Sogdian rulers being relocated from the area to become the Caliph's officers. Despite the conversion of some Karluk Turks after the Battle of Talas, the majority of Karluks did not convert to Islam until the mid-10th century, when they established the Kara-Khanid Khanate.

== Aftermath: Islamization of Central Asia ==
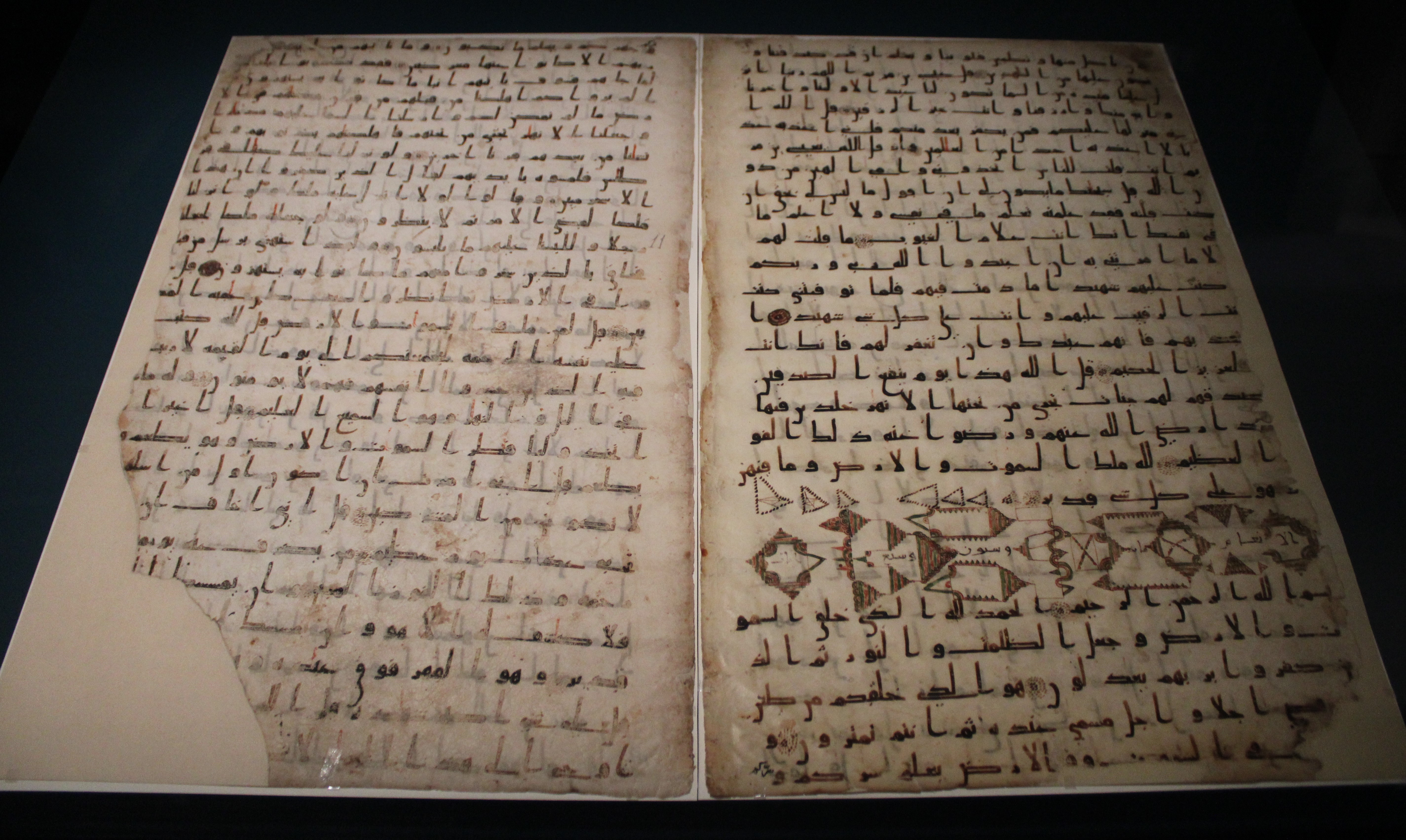
Two folio sheets from a Qur'an, found in the sanctuary of Katta Langar, south of Samarkand, first half of the 8th century.

The process of Islamization of local peoples was slow during the Umayyad Caliphate period, but it became more intensive during the following Abbasid period. The Umayyads treated the local non-Muslims as second class citizens and did not encourage conversions, therefore only few Soghdian commoners converted to Islam during their rule. However, during the Abbasid period non-Arabs gained an equal status with conversion and as a result, Islam began spreading across Central Asia.

== See also ==
- Bakhtiyar Khalji's Tibet campaign
