= Khatun of Bukhara =

Queen regent of Bukhara from before 674 to 689

Khatun of Bukhara (died 689) was a queen regent of Bukhara from before 674 until 689, during the minority of her son Tughshada of Bukhara.

She was of Irano-Turkic origin. Her name is unknown and she is known simply as the Khatun of Bukhara ("Queen of Bukhara"). She was married to Bidun of Bukhara, and the mother of Tughshada of Bukhara.

When Bidun of Bukhara died, Khatun became regent of Bukhara during the minority of their son Tughshada. An account described how the queen left her palace (kakh), in the citadel each morning and each evening to review her nobles and servants, and how she issued her decrees from the throne in Registan Gate.

In 673, Ubaydullah bin Ziyad was appointed governor of Khorasan for the Umayyad Caliphate, and in 674 he invaded Central Asia by crossing the Oxus river with an Umayyad army, conquering and pillaging Ramitin and Paykand. The queen forged an alliance with a Turkic ruler who came to her aid, but was defeated in 674. The queen was obliged to make a deal with the Umayyads to save her city, and paid a million dirhams in silver. She paid tribute in silver in 675 and 676.

In 676, the Umayyads took eighty Turkic nobles, her subjects, captive. Despite a promise that they would be returned, the Turkic captives were deported as slaves to Medina, where they were worked as agricultural slaves until they rebelled, killed their enslaver and committed mass suicide.

She died in 689 and Vardan Khudah Khunak succeeded her as the regent of her son.
