= Narshakhi =

10th-century Sogdian historian

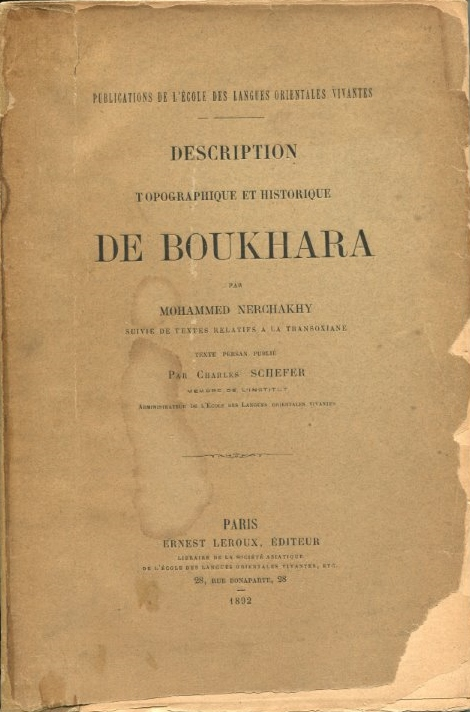
French first edition of Narshakhi's History of Bukhara, 1892

Abu Bakr Muhammad ibn Jafar Narshakhi (or Narshaki) (ca. 899–959), a Sogdian scholar from the village of Narshak in the Bukhara oasis is the first known historian in Central Asia. His unique History of Bukhara (Tarikh-i Bukhara) was written in Arabic and presented to the Samanid emperor Nuh I either in 943 or 944. The book provides important information on Bukhara that cannot be found in other contemporary sources. Nothing is known about Narshakhi except his authorship of this one book.

== Biography ==
Narshakhi was a Sogdian. Even though the Sogdian language had been mostly supplanted by Persian language in densely populated places of Sogdia in his day, it is likely that Narshakhi still spoke Sogdian very well.

His History of Bukhara (Tarikh-i Bukhara) was composed for a patron who supported Sunni Islam against Isma'ilism. Through Da'i missionaries engaged in the da'wah the Isma'ili sect of Shi'ism had spread and was regarded as a threat by the Sunni. It was written in a time of upheaval for the Samanids. Nasr II had converted to Isma'ili Shi'ism, and his son, Nuh ibn Nasr was confronted with a political turmoil that saw his vizier and other members of his court killed. Nuh purged the da'is and killed Isma'ili converts in an attempt to undo their encroaching influence, but the situation in the court remained tense. The Samanids, whose roots lay in Sogdia, had assumed the role of guardians of Sunni law, in opposition to the Saffarids in Sistan and the Samanids. They commissioned the translation of Arabic works like the History of Prophets and Kings into Persian. These texts were altered in translation; Tarikh-i Bukhara, translated by Abu Nasr Ahmad al-Qubavi, expanded the text to cover a longer period of time, but this Persian translation was later abridged by Muhammad ibn Zufar ibn 'Umar in the 12th century.

=== Other translations of The History of Bukhara ===
In 1128 or 1129, Abu Nasr Ahmad al-Qubavi translated Narshakhi's original Arabic text into Persian, with abridgments and additional content to extend the history to 975.

Charles-Henri-Auguste Schefer published an abridged French translation in 1892.

In 1954, historian Richard N. Frye translated the Persian abridgment of the book into English.
