= Aslam ibn Zur'a al-Kilabi =

Arab chieftain

Aslam ibn Zurʿa ibn ʿAmr ibn Khuwaylid al-Ṣāʿiq al-Kilābī (Arabic: أسلم بن زرعة الكلابي) (fl. 665–681) was a prominent Arab chieftain of the Qays tribal faction in Basra and Khurasan and served as the governor of Khurasan in 675 and 677–679. In the period between his two terms, he continued to wield significant influence in the province alongside the governor Sa'id ibn Uthman. Unlike his predecessors and many of his successors, Aslam did not undertake further conquests from the Khurasan frontier into Transoxiana (Central Asia). Regarding possession of war booty and tribute, he consistently defended the interests of the Arab tribesmen in Khurasan, who made up the core of the Umayyad Caliphate's forces there and insisted on controlling the funds due to the high costs of their military activity, against the demands of the central government in Syria. Aslam was known to have imposed heavy taxation on the population of Khurasan. He was arrested by Qays ibn al-Haytham al-Sulami, who extracted from him 300,000 silver dirhams. Aslam was later dispatched to suppress a small Kharijite force in Ahwaz in 680/81, but was defeated. His son Sa'id and grandson Muslim also held high office.

== Ancestry ==
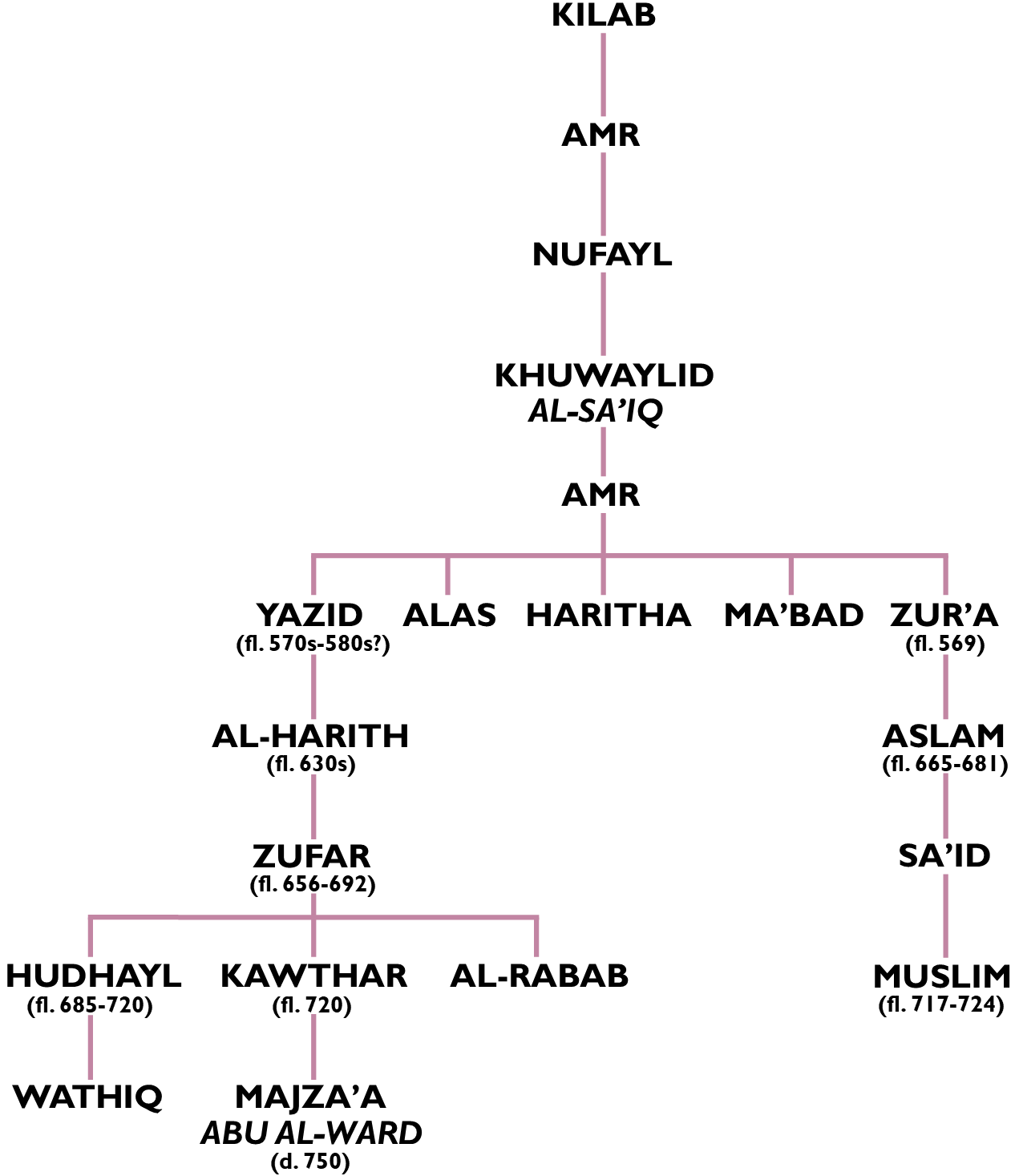
Aslam was a descendant of the pre-Islamic chiefs of the Amr branch of the Banu Kilab. He and his son Sa'id and grandson Muslim were based in Basra and held office in Khurasan under the Umayyads

Aslam's father Zur'a was active in the pre-Islamic period (pre-630) and may have been a sharif (Arab tribal nobleman). Aslam's grandfather was Amr ibn Khuwaylid al-Sa'iq. His great-grandfather Khuwaylid ibn Nufayl was referred to as 'al-Sa'iq' because he was killed in a lightning strike (sa'iq). They were chiefs of the Amr section of the Banu Kilab, the leading branch of the powerful Banu Amir tribe in the southwestern Najd (central Arabia). The mother of Zur'a was al-Ruwa of the Banu Numayr, another branch of the Banu Amir. His brothers were Yazid ibn al-Sa'iq, a poet and prominent chief of the Amr ibn Kilab, Ma'bad, Haritha and Alas. Zur'a fought alongside his tribesmen against the Banu Tamim at the Battle of al-Rahrahan, c. 569, but it is not clear whether or not he was slain in the battle. He was most likely the 'Zur'a' mourned in a poem by Tufayl ibn Awf of the Banu Ghani:

Nay! Never have I seen of people who have perished one like Zur'a on the day when the women rose in mourning.
To be a greater loss or more dearly missed by his relations, nor nobler in striving. — from the diwan of Tufayl ibn Awf

== Career ==
Aslam lived in Basra and was a leading tribesman of the Qays, a faction comprising the Banu Amir and other northern Arabian tribes. He was a supporter of Mu'awiya ibn Abi Sufyan, the first Umayyad caliph. He was sent to Khurasan several times. According to the 9th-century historian al-Tabari, Mu'awiya's governor of Iraq and the eastern Caliphate, Ziyad ibn Abihi, appointed Aslam and several other Arab tribal nobles as tax collectors in the administration of Khurasan's governor al-Hakam ibn Amr al-Ghifari in 665.

=== Governorship of Khurasan ===
Aslam was appointed lieutenant governor of Khurasan by Ubayd Allah ibn Ziyad, in 674. He succeeded Ubayd Allah in 675 when Mu'awiya transferred Ubayd Allah to the governorship of Basra. Unlike Ubayd Allah and other Arab predecessors in Khurasan, Aslam did not undertake any conquests in the region. The historian Muhammad Abdulhayy Shaban holds it was likely that Aslam's authority was initially restricted to military matters in the province. Ubayd Allah had brought back large amounts of war booty and tribute from Khurasan to Mu'awiya to the chagrin of the Arab tribal garrisons. As Khurasan was a frontier province, the launchpad for conquests and raids in Transoxiana (Central Asia), the garrisons incurred a heavy expense in raising armies and engaging in distant campaigns. Thus, with the exception of the customary one-fifth due to the central treasury, the tribesmen insisted that booty and tribute remain in their possession. Mu'awiya, encouraged by the sums brought to him by Ubayd Allah, sought to exert closer control of Khurasan's finances and appointed his own loyalist, Ishaq ibn Talha, to take charge of fiscal affairs. Ishaq he died on his way to Khurasan and Aslam assumed Ishaq's authority, standing in as the tribes' representative with the caliph. At the time, Mu'awiya was attempting to rally support by the Qays in Syria for the nomination of his son Yazid I as his successor. This may have been his rationale for ignoring the move by Aslam, who maintained significant support from the Qays in Damascus.

In the following year Aslam was replaced by Sa'id ibn Uthman, who was invested with fiscal and military authority in the province. As a result of Aslam's influence with the tribesmen, Sa'id was compelled to accept him as his partner over Khurasan. Aslam and Sa'id entered into disagreements over possession of the war booty following Sa'id's campaigns into Transoxiana. Aslam refused to give Sa'id the tax revenue he collected from the province to forward to the central government; rather, he delivered it to Ubayd Allah in person in Basra, and lodged a complaint about Sa'id to Mu'awiya. As a result, Sa'id was obligated leave office in 677 and Aslam was appointed in his place. Aslam did not launch any conquests, military activity restricted to the annual summer expeditions. In this regard, the historian H. A. R. Gibb referred to him as "indolent". Aslam was known to have imposed heavy taxes on the population. The inhabitants of Khurasan used the proverb, "More vile than Aslam", to exhibit their disdain for harsh rulers.

Mu'awiya resolved to restore caliphal authority in Khurasan and appointed Ubayd Allah's brother Abd al-Rahman governor in 679. Abd al-Rahman dispatched ahead of him Qays ibn al-Haytham al-Sulami, an influential Qaysite leader like Aslam. He arrested Aslam and forced him to surrender 300,000 dirhams. Abd al-Rahman reasserted central control over the provincial tax revenue and tribute. He was replaced with his brother Salm by Caliph Yazid in 681. Salm recommenced the conquests into Transoxiana and in a likely appeal to the supporters of Aslam in the province, arrested and humiliated Qays ibn al-Haytham.

=== Later career ===
In 680/81 Ubayd Allah, whose jurisdiction by then spanned Iraq and Khurasan, appointed Aslam at the head of 2,000 troops to eliminate Abu Bilal Mirdas ibn Udayya, a Kharijite leader based in Ahwaz. The Kharijites were generally opposed to Umayyad rule and Abu Bilal and forty of his followers had established themselves in Ahwaz where they collected their own levy from the population in defiance of Ubayd Allah. Aslam engaged Abu Bilal at an Ahwaz village called Asak where the significantly outnumbered Kharijites repulsed Aslam and his troops. Aslam was ridiculed in the streets of Basra for his defeat, with adults and children chanting against him "Abu Bilal is behind you!" In response, Ubayd Allah assigned a personal security force for Aslam to suppress such crowds. Ubayd Allah sent another force against Abu Bilal led by a tribesman of the Banu Tamim, Abbad ibn al-Akhdar, who ambushed and massacred Abu Bilal and his men.

== Bibliography ==
- Beeman, William O. (2004). "The Concept: 'Risk': East and West". Bulletin of the Royal Institute for Inter-Faith Studies. 6 (1): 29–46.
- Bosworth, C. E. (1968). Sīstān under the Arabs: From the Islamic Conquest to the Rise of the Ṣaffārids (30–250, 651–864). Rome: Istituto italiano per il Medio ed Estremo Oriente. ISBN 9788863231243. OCLC 956878036.
- Caskel, Werner (1966). Ğamharat an-nasab: Das genealogische Werk des His̆ām ibn Muḥammad al-Kalbī, Volume II (in German). Leiden: Brill.
- Crone, Patricia (1980). Slaves on Horses: The Evolution of the Islamic Polity. Cambridge: Cambridge University Press. ISBN 0-521-52940-9.
- Gibb, H. A. R. (1923). The Arab Conquests in Central Asia. London: The Royal Asiatic Society. OCLC 499987512.
- Howard, I. K. A., ed. (1990). The History of al-Ṭabarī, Volume XIX: The Caliphate of Yazīd ibn Muʿāwiyah, A.D. 680–683/A.H. 60–64. SUNY Series in Near Eastern Studies. Albany, New York: State University of New York Press. ISBN 978-0-7914-0040-1.
- Kassis, Riad Aziz (1999). The Book of Proverbs and Arabic Proverbial Works. Leiden and Boston and Koln: Brill. ISBN 90-04-11305-3.
- Krenkow, F. (1927). The Poems of Ṭufail ibn ʻAuf al-Ghanawī and aṭ-Ṭirimmāḥ ibn Ḥakīm aṭ-Ṭāʼyī. London: Luzac and Co.
- Levi Della Vida, G. (1993). Bosworth, C. E.; van Donzel, E.; Heinrichs, W. P. & Pellat, Ch. (eds.). The Encyclopaedia of Islam, Second Edition. Volume VII: Mif–Naz. Leiden: E. J. Brill. pp. 123–124. ISBN 978-90-04-09419-2.
- Lyall, Charles (1918). The Mufaḍḍalīyāt: An Anthology of Ancient Arabian Odes, Volume 2. Oxford: Clarendon Press.
- Meyer, Egber (1970). Der historische Gehalt der Aiyām al-'Arab (in German). Wiesbaden: Otto Harrassowitz. ISBN 9783447012706.
- Morony, Michael G., ed. (1987). The History of al-Ṭabarī, Volume XVIII: Between Civil Wars: The Caliphate of Muʿāwiyah, 661–680 A.D./A.H. 40–60. SUNY Series in Near Eastern Studies. Albany, New York: State University of New York Press. ISBN 978-0-87395-933-9.
- Shaban, M. A. (1970). The Abbasid Revolution. Cambridge University Press. ISBN 0-521-29534-3.
