= Qays ibn al-Haytham al-Sulami =

7th century Arab commander and administrator

Sub-Governor of Nishapur
- In office 649/650–656
- Monarch: Uthman (r. 644–656)

Sub-Governor of Khurasan
- In office 656
- Monarch: Uthman
- Succeeded by: Abd Allah ibn Khazim al-Sulami
- In office 661
- Monarch: Mu'awiya I (r. 661–680)
- Preceded by: 663
- Succeeded by: Abd Allah ibn Khazim al-Sulami

Deputy governor of Marw al-Rudh
- In office 665
- Monarch: Mu'awiya I

Personal details
- Died: After 684
- Relations: Banu Sulaym (tribe)
- Children: Shabib ibn Qays

Qays ibn al-Haytham al-Sulamī (Arabic: قيس بن الهيثم السلمي) (fl. 649 – 684) was an Arab commander and administrator in the service of the Rashidun, Umayyad and Zubayrid caliphates. Under the caliphs Uthman (r. 644–656) and Mu'awiya I (r. 661–680) he served at time as the sub-governor of Khurasan and the cities of Nishapur and Marw al-Rudh. He was from a prominent Arab family in Basra and was a leader among the tribal nobility of that city until his death after 684.

== Life ==
Qays ibn al-Haytham belonged to the Banu Sulaym tribe, a component of the Qays/Mudar faction. He came from a prominent family in Basra, part of the Mudar ashraf (Arab tribal nobility). His full name is given as Qays ibn al-Haytham ibn Qays ibn al-Salt ibn Habib or Qays ibn al-Haytham ibn Asma ibn al-Salt. The 8th-century historian Sayf ibn Umar names Qays's brother Amr as a participant in the Muslim conquest of Iraq in 634, but this was deemed implausible by the historian Khalid Yahya Blankinship. According to al-Baladhuri, an uncle of Qays, Asim ibn Qays ibn al-Salt, was appointed by Abu Musa al-Ash'ari governor of the town of Manadhir in the Ahwaz region after it was conquered from the Sasanians by Rabi ibn Ziyad al-Harithi around 638.

Qays was appointed by Caliph Uthman (r. 644–656) over the Nishapur district of Khurasan in 649/50. Before his assassination in 656, Uthman expanded Qays' governorship to the entire province of Khurasan. Qays appointed his paternal cousin, Abd Allah ibn Khazim al-Sulami, as his deputy governor and left the province for Basra to assess the political situation in the wake of Uthman's death; however, Ibn Khazim, using a diploma he previously obtained from the governor of Basra, Abd Allah ibn Amir, declared himself governor and remained in the post until his dismissal by Caliph Ali (r. 656–661). Qays was angered by his cousin's ruse and reportedly stated: "I had a better right than Abd Allah to be the son of [Abd Allah's mother] Ajla." When Mu'awiya I acceded to the caliphate in 661, Qays was reappointed governor of Khurasan by the order of Ibn Amir or the caliph himself. He remained in the post for two years. He was again replaced by his cousin Abd Allah after failing to quell a revolt at Qarin and briefly imprisoned in Basra until his mother intervened on his behalf. He was later made the deputy governor of Basra by Ibn Amir when the latter visited Mu'awiya's court in Syria in 664.

After Ziyad ibn Abihi was appointed governor of Basra in 665, he appointed Qays as governor of Marw al-Rudh in Khurasan. In 678/79, Ziyad's son Abd al-Rahman was made governor of Khurasan by Mu'awiya. By then, Qays had become the leader of the Banu Sulaym faction of Basra, one of five tribal divisions of the city's garrison. Abd al-Rahman appointed Qays his deputy and had him enter the province ahead of him. Afterward, Qays arrested the powerful tribal chief Aslam ibn Zur'a al-Kilabi. During the reign of Caliph Yazid I (r. 680–683), in 680/81, the caliph's new appointee over Khurasan, Abd al-Rahman's brother Salm, dispatched his lieutenant al-Harith ibn Mu'awiya al-Harithi to settle matters for him in the province before his arrival. Al-Harith arrested and imprisoned Qays and put his son Shabib in shackles. Qays later returned to Basra where he continued as a nobleman of the Sulaym and the wider Mudar confederation (which was opposed to the Azd–Rabi'a confederation). Together with a Basran tribal noble from the Azd–Rabi'a faction, al-Nu'man ibn Suhban al-Rasibi, Qays was an arbitrator for selecting the successor of Ubayd Allah ibn Ziyad as governor of Basra following Ubayd Allah's expulsion in the aftermath of Yazid's death in 683.

Basra and most of the Caliphate recognized the Mecca-based, anti-Umayyad Abd Allah ibn al-Zubayr as caliph. Qays was dispatched with the Basran security forces to stamp out an attempt by supporters of al-Mukhtar al-Thaqafi, the pro-Alid ruler of Kufa, to gain control of Basra. He died after 684.

== Bibliography ==
- Blankinship, Khalid Yahya, ed. (1993). The History of al-Ṭabarī, Volume XI: The Challenge to the Empires. SUNY Series in Near Eastern Studies. Albany, New York: State University of New York Press. ISBN 978-0-7914-0851-3.
- Fishbein, Michael, ed. (1990). The History of al-Ṭabarī, Volume XXI: The Victory of the Marwānids, A.D. 685–693/A.H. 66–73. SUNY Series in Near Eastern Studies. Albany, New York: State University of New York Press. ISBN 978-0-7914-0221-4.
- Humphreys, R. Stephen, ed. (1990). The History of al-Ṭabarī, Volume XV: The Crisis of the Early Caliphate: The Reign of ʿUthmān, A.D. 644–656/A.H. 24–35. SUNY Series in Near Eastern Studies. Albany, New York: State University of New York Press. ISBN 978-0-7914-0154-5.
- Hawting, G. R., ed. (1996). The History of al-Ṭabarī, Volume XVII: The First Civil War: From the Battle of Siffīn to the Death of ʿAlī, A.D. 656–661/A.H. 36–40. SUNY Series in Near Eastern Studies. Albany, New York: State University of New York Press. ISBN 978-0-7914-2393-6.
- Hawting, G. R., ed. (1989). The History of al-Ṭabarī, Volume XX: The Collapse of Sufyānid Authority and the Coming of the Marwānids: The Caliphates of Muʿāwiyah II and Marwān I and the Beginning of the Caliphate of ʿAbd al-Malik, A.D. 683–685/A.H. 64–66. SUNY Series in Near Eastern Studies. Albany, New York: State University of New York Press. ISBN 978-0-88706-855-3.
- Howard, I. K. A., ed. (1990). The History of al-Ṭabarī, Volume XIX: The Caliphate of Yazīd ibn Muʿāwiyah, A.D. 680–683/A.H. 60–64. SUNY Series in Near Eastern Studies. Albany, New York: State University of New York Press. ISBN 978-0-7914-0040-1.
- Morony, Michael G., ed. (1987). The History of al-Ṭabarī, Volume XVIII: Between Civil Wars: The Caliphate of Muʿāwiyah, 661–680 A.D./A.H. 40–60. SUNY Series in Near Eastern Studies. Albany, New York: State University of New York Press. ISBN 978-0-87395-933-9.
- Murgotten, Francis Clark (1924). The Origins of the Islamic State, Being a Translation from the Arabic, Accompanied with Annotations, Geographic and Historic Notes of the Kitâb Fitûh al-Buldân of al-Imâm Abu-l Abbâs Ahmad Ibn-Jâbir al-Balâdhuri, Part 2. New York and London: Columbia University & Longman, Green & Co.
- Morony, Michael G., ed. (1987). The History of al-Ṭabarī, Volume XVIII: Between Civil Wars: The Caliphate of Muʿāwiyah, 661–680 A.D./A.H. 40–60. SUNY Series in Near Eastern Studies. Albany, New York: State University of New York Press. ISBN 978-0-87395-933-9.
