= Abd Allah ibn Khazim al-Sulami =

Umayyad Provincial governor (died 692)

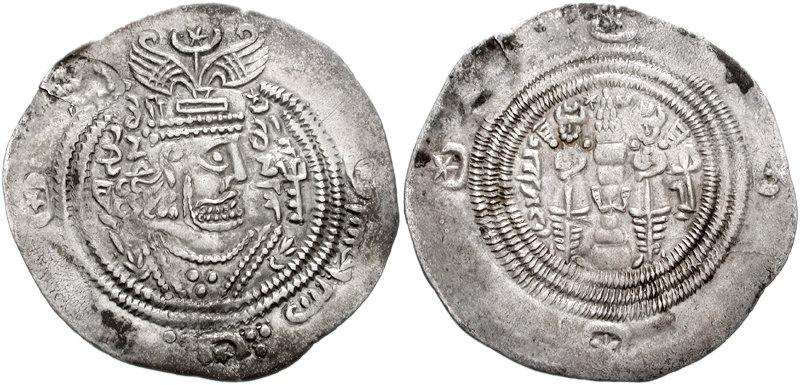
- Sasanian-style silver dirham minted in 683/84 in the name of Abd Allah ibn Khazim

Umayyad governor of Khurasan
- In office 662–665
- Monarch: Mu'awiya I
- Preceded by: Qays ibn al-Haytham al-Sulami

Umayyad and Zubayrid governor of Khurasan
- In office 683/84–692
- Monarchs: Mu'awiya II (r. 683–684); Abd Allah ibn al-Zubayr (r. 684–692)
- Preceded by: Salm ibn Ziyad
- Succeeded by: Bukayr ibn Wisha al-Sa'di

Personal details
- Died: 692; Shahmighad, north of Merv
- Children: Muhammad; Musa; Sulayman
- Parent(s): Khazim ibn Zabyan; Ajla

ʿAbd Allāh ibn Khāzim al-Sulamī (Arabic: عبد الله بن خازم السلمي) (fl. 652 - died 692) was the Umayyad governor of Khurasan between 662 and 665 and again in late 683, before becoming the nominal Zubayrid governor of the same province between 684 and his death.

== Life ==
=== Early career ===
Abd Allah ibn Khazim was the son of Khazim ibn Zabyan of the Banu Sulaym tribe and his wife Ajla. In 651 or 652, during the first Muslim campaign into Khurasan, Abdallah ibn Amir put Ibn Khazim in command of the Arab army's advance guard with Ibn Khazim then capturing the town of Sarakhs. He was later appointed by Caliph Uthman (r. 644–656) as governor of Nishapur, alongside Ibn Khazim's paternal cousin Qays ibn al-Haytham al-Sulami. Toward the end of his reign, Uthman combined the administrative districts east of Basra into the single province of Khurasan, though it remained a dependency of Basra, under the governorship of Qays. Qays made Ibn Khazim his envoy to the governor of Basra, Ibn Amir.

According to historian al-Tabari, Ibn Khazim acquired a document from Ibn Amir that declared Ibn Khazim governor of Khurasan should Qays depart the province. Indeed, when Uthman was assassinated in January 656, Qays departed Khurasan to investigate the situation in Iraq with Ibn Khazim being given authority over the province until being dismissed by Caliph Ali (r. 656–661) later that year.

Abdallah ibn Amir was reinstated as governor of Basra in 656. He dispatched Ibn Khazim and Abd al-Rahman ibn Samura to Balkh and Sijistan (Sistan) to restore Muslim rule, while Qays was made governor of Khurasan. When Qays proved incapable of controlling the province, he was replaced by Ibn Khazim, who put down a rebellion in Qarin in 662. He remained governor of the province until being dismissed in 665 by Ziyad ibn Abih, who had replaced Ibn Amir as governor of Basra in mid-665.

=== Governor of Khurasan ===
Ibn Khazim was later part of a group of Arab tribal commanders who accompanied Salm ibn Ziyad to Khurasan in 681 from Basra when Salm was appointed governor of Khurasan by Caliph Yazid I (r. 680–683). Salm left Ibn Khazim in charge of the province after fleeing in the wake of the successive deaths of caliphs Yazid and his son Mu'awiya II in 683 and 684, which caused the collapse of Umayyad rule. Ibn Khazim gave his allegiance to the Mecca-based caliph Abd Allah ibn al-Zubayr. Early on, he contended with mutinies by troops from the Rabi'a tribe and the military governors of Herat and Marw al-Rudh, who both hailed from the Banu Bakr tribe. He was assisted in their suppression by troops from the Banu Tamim, another large tribal faction from which many Khurasani Arab troops hailed. He installed his son Muhammad at Herat while he took up his headquarters at Marw al-Rudh. Afterwards, the Tamim revolted, captured Herat and killed Muhammad before turning their attention toward Ibn Khazim. However, before they could move against him, dissension developed among them and their rebel army disbanded.

Ibn Khazim's position in Khurasan was strong when the Umayyads under Caliph Abd al-Malik defeated and killed Ibn al-Zubayr and his brother Mus'ab in Mecca and Iraq. Thus, in 692 he refused to pay allegiance to Abd al-Malik when the latter demanded it, despite being offered the governorship for a further seven years. In response, Abd al-Malik entering into an alliance with a factional leader of the Tamim, Bukayr ibn Wisha al-Sa'di, who agreed to eliminate Ibn Khazim in return for the governorship of Khurasan.

==== Alliance with the Hephthalites (689 CE) ====
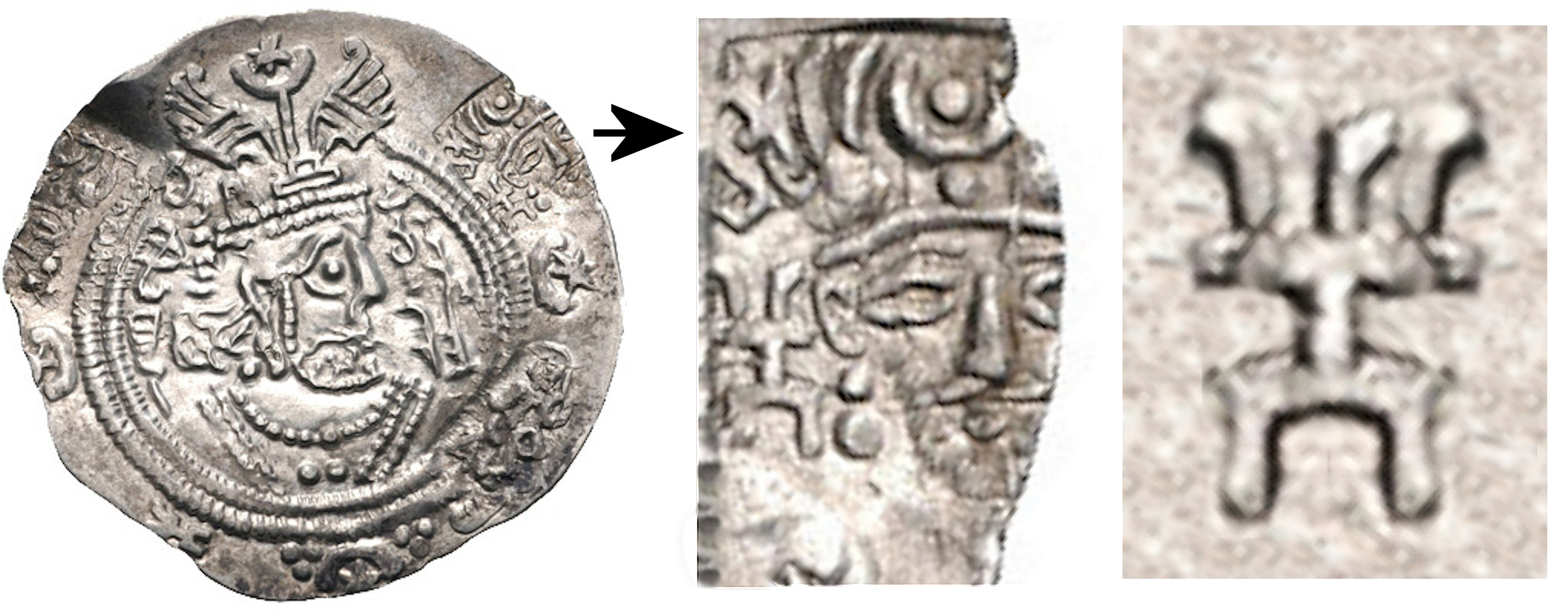
Hephthalite copy of a Sasano-Arab coin of Abd Allah ibn Khazim with AH 69 (688 CE) date. In the margin: a Hephthalite countermark with crowned facing head and a late Hephthalite tamgha. Circa 700 CE.

Around 689 CE, the Hephthalite ruler of Badghis and the Arab rebel Musa ibn Abd Allah ibn Khazim, son of the Zubayrid governor of Khurasan Abd Allah ibn Khazim al-Sulami, entered an alliance against the forces of the Umayyad Caliphate. The Hepthalites and their allies captured Termez in 689, repelled the Arabs, and occupied the whole region of Khorasan for a brief period, with Termez as their capital, described by the Arabs as "the headquarters of the Hephthalites" (dār mamlakat al-Hayāṭela).

=== Death of Abd Allah ibn Khazim (692 CE) ===
At some time before the end of 692, Ibn Khazim was intercepted and killed by Bukayr ibn Wisha al-Sa'di's troops on his way to his son Musa's fortified stronghold at Tirmidh. According to al-Tabari, the troops of a rival Tamimi commander, Bahir ibn Warqa, killed Ibn Khazim in the village of Shahmighad, north of Marw, but Bukayr seized Ibn Khazim's severed head and sent it to Abd al-Malik taking credit for the slaying. Before he died, Ibn Khazim reportedly spat at his killer, a tribesman whose brother Ibn Khazim had previously executed, exclaiming defiantly that he was chief of the Mudar tribal confederation, while his killer's brother was a mere peasant. A poet from his tribe lamented his loss, declaring "Now only barking dogs remain. After you there is no lion's roar on Earth". Indeed, Ibn Khazim's career was posthumously chronicled in epics that extolled his military prowess, which historian H. A. R. Gibb asserts "makes it difficult to establish many details with precision".

==== Arab renewed control of Khorasan (704 CE) ====
The Arabs of the Umayyad Caliphate under Yazid ibn al-Muhallab re-captured Termez in 704. Nezak Tarkan, the ruler of the Hephthalites of Badghis, led a new revolt in 709 with the support of other principalities as well as his nominal ruler, the Yabghu of Tokharistan. In 710, Qutaiba ibn Muslim was able to re-establish Muslim control over Tokharistan and captured Nizak Tarkan who was executed on al-Hajjaj's orders, despite promises of a pardon, while the Yabghu was exiled to Damascus and kept there as a hostage.

Ibn Khazim's grandson, Salim ibn Sulayman, was a lieutenant commander in the army of Muslim ibn Sa'id al-Kilabi, governor of Khurasan from 722 to 724.

== Bibliography ==
- Blankinship, Khalid Yahya, ed. (1989). The History of al-Ṭabarī, Volume XXV: The End of Expansion: The Caliphate of Hishām, A.D. 724–738/A.H. 105–120. SUNY Series in Near Eastern Studies. Albany, New York: State University of New York Press. ISBN 978-0-88706-569-9.
- Gibb, H. A. R. (1960). "ʿAbd Allāh ibn Khāzim". In Gibb, H. A. R.; Kramers, J. H.; Lévi-Provençal, E.; Schacht, J.; Lewis, B. & Pellat, Ch. (eds.). The Encyclopaedia of Islam, Second Edition. Volume I: A–B. Leiden: E. J. Brill. pp. 47–48. OCLC 495469456.
- Beckwith, Christopher (2009). Empires of the Silk Road. Princeton University Press.
- Shaban, M. A. (1979). The Abbasid Revolution. Cambridge University Press. pp. 160–161. ISBN 0-521-29534-3.
- Fishbein, Michael, ed. (1990). The History of al-Ṭabarī, Volume XXI: The Victory of the Marwānids, A.D. 685–693/A.H. 66–73. SUNY Series in Near Eastern Studies. Albany, New York: State University of New York Press. ISBN 978-0-7914-0221-4.
- Howard, I. K. A., ed. (1990). The History of al-Ṭabarī, Volume XIX: The Caliphate of Yazīd ibn Muʿāwiyah, A.D. 680–683/A.H. 60–64. SUNY Series in Near Eastern Studies. Albany, New York: State University of New York Press. ISBN 978-0-7914-0040-1.
- Humphreys, R. Stephen, ed. (1990). The History of al-Ṭabarī, Volume XV: The Crisis of the Early Caliphate: The Reign of ʿUthmān, A.D. 644–656/A.H. 24–35. SUNY Series in Near Eastern Studies. Albany, New York: State University of New York Press. ISBN 978-0-7914-0154-5.
- Kennedy, Hugh (2007). The Great Arab Conquests: How the Spread of Islam Changed the World We Live In. Philadelphia, Pennsylvania: Da Capo Press. ISBN 978-0-306-81740-3.
- Shaban, M. A. (1970). The ʿAbbāsid Revolution. Cambridge: Cambridge University Press. ISBN 0-521-29534-3.
- Zakeri, Mohsen (1995). Sasanid Soldiers in Early Muslim Society: The Origins of 'Ayyārān and Futuwwa. Otto Harrassowitz Verlag. ISBN 9783447036528.
- Gibb, H. A. R. (1923). The Arab Conquests in Central Asia. London: The Royal Asiatic Society. OCLC 499987512.
