= Abbad ibn Ziyad =

Umayyad Commander and statesman

ʿAbbād ibn Ziyād ibn Abīhi عبّاد بن زياد بن أبيه

Governor of Sijistan
- In office 673–681
- Succeeded by: Salm ibn Ziyad

Personal details
- Died: 718 or 719
- Parent: Ziyad ibn Abihi (father)
- Relatives: Ubayd Allah, Salm, Yazid (brothers)

Military service
- Allegiance: Umayyad Caliphate
- Years of service: 673–705
- Battles/wars: Second Fitna; Battle of Marj Rahit

ʿAbbād ibn Ziyād ibn Abīhi (Arabic: عبّاد بن زياد بن أبيه) (died 718/19) was an Arab commander and statesman of the Umayyad Caliphate. A son of the governor of Iraq, Ziyad ibn Abihi, Abbad served as a governor of Sijistan between 673 and 681 under caliphs Mu'awiya I (r. 661–680) and Yazid I (r. 680–683). He led a contingent in the army of Caliph Marwan I (r. 684–685) at the Battle of Marj Rahit and afterward fought against loyalists of al-Mukhtar al-Thaqafi during the reign of Caliph Abd al-Malik (r. 685–705). He later served at the court of the latter's son and successor, Caliph al-Walid I (r. 705–715), and played a role in the succession intrigues between al-Walid's son Abd al-Aziz and the caliph's brother, Sulayman.

== Governor of Sijistan ==
Abbad was the son of Ziyad ibn Abihi, the Umayyad governor of Iraq, and a brother of Ziyad's successor Ubayd Allah ibn Ziyad, with whom he had a close relationship. The Umayyad caliph Mu'awiya I (r. 661–680) appointed Abbad governor of the eastern province of Sijistan (Sistan) in 673, and he was reconfirmed in the post by Mu'awiya's son and successor Yazid I (r. 680–683). While the historian Muhammad Abdulhayy Shaban notes that Sijistan remained stable under Abbad's rule with no record of rebellions in the province or military expeditions originating from there, the historian K. V. Zetterstéen asserts that Abbad was an active participant in the eastward expansion of the Caliphate and credited him with leading the conquest of Kandahar.

Starting in 674 Abbad patronized a well-known poet in his entourage, Ibn Mufarrigh al-Himyari (d. 688), who played the role of Abbad's panegyrist. As Abbad became occupied with his post, he stopped tending to Ibn Muffarigh and his poems, causing the poet to compose satirical verses against Abbad and his father. Abbad detained him for a short period, but Ibn Muffarigh continued to insult his erstwhile patron's family in verse after he was released. He was captured and humiliated in public by Ubayd Allah in Basra and sent back to Abbad who kept jailed him until he was released by the caliph's intervention in 680.

During Abbad's governorship of Sijistan, Ubayd Allah served as governor in Iraq and his brother Abd al-Rahman served as governor of Khurasan. Abbad was replaced in 681 when Yazid put Khurasan and Sijistan under the authority of Abbad's brother, Salm, who in turn appointed another brother, Yazid, as his deputy in the province. This chronology, according to the 8th-century historian Umar ibn Shabba is disputed by the information in Tarikh-i Sistan and 9th-century historian al-Yaqubi, which holds that Ubayd Allah appointed Yazid before 681. In any case, Ubayd Allah informed Abbad of the developments, and in reaction to his dismissal, Abbad divvied up the funds of Sijistan's treasuries among his slaves and Arab troops before departing the province. On his way back to report to Caliph Yazid in Damascus, Abbad avoided encountering Salm when passing through the vicinity of Jiroft in Kirman. In response to Yazid's inquiry regarding the treasury sums Abbad was expected to bring the caliph, he stated that he was obliged to pay the large number of troops under his authority as would be expected of him, in such a critical frontier region as Sijistan.

== Later career and death ==
Following the collapse of Umayyad authority in the caliphate's eastern provinces in the aftermath of Caliph Yazid's death, Abbad relocated with 2,000 of his mawālī (non-Arab, Muslim freedmen or clients) to Syria where they fought alongside the army of the Umayyad caliph Marwan I at the Battle of Marj Rahit in 684. In contrast, Zetterstéen claims Abbad's contingent at Marj Rahit consisted of his own kinsmen. Following the decisive Umayyad victory in the battle, Abbad sought to retire to the north Arabian oasis town of Dumat al-Jandal, but was dispatched by Caliph Abd al-Malik to confront a commander of the Kufa-based, pro-Alid rebel leader al-Mukhtar al-Thaqafi at some point prior to 687. Abbad later advised Caliph al-Walid I (r. 705–715) when the latter unsuccessfully attempted to replace the caliph's brother Sulayman in the line of succession with al-Walid's son Abd al-Aziz. Though Zetterstéen claims Abbad's date of death is not known, the historians I. K. A. Howard and Khurshid Ahmad Fariq state Abbad died in 718/19.

== Bibliography ==
- Bosworth, C. E. (1968). Sīstān under the Arabs: From the Islamic Conquest to the Rise of the Ṣaffārids (30–250, 651–864). Rome: Istituto italiano per il Medio ed Estremo Oriente.
- Fariq, K. A. (1966). Ziyād b. Abīh. London: Asia Publishing House. OCLC 581630755.
- Howard, I. K. A., ed. (1990). The History of al-Ṭabarī, Volume XIX: The Caliphate of Yazīd ibn Muʿāwiyah, A.D. 680–683/A.H. 60–64. SUNY Series in Near Eastern Studies. Albany, New York: State University of New York Press. ISBN 978-0-7914-0040-1.
- Hinds, Martin, ed. (1990). The History of al-Ṭabarī, Volume XXIII: The Zenith of the Marwānid House: The Last Years of ʿAbd al-Malik and the Caliphate of al-Walīd, A.D. 700–715/A.H. 81–95. SUNY Series in Near Eastern Studies. Albany, New York: State University of New York Press. ISBN 978-0-88706-721-1.
- Kennedy, Hugh (2001). The Armies of the Caliphs: Military and Society in the Early Islamic State. Routledge. ISBN 0-415-25092-7.
- Pellat, Ch. (1971). "Ibn Mufarrigh". In Lewis, B.; Ménage, V. L.; Pellat, Ch. & Schacht, J. (eds.). The Encyclopaedia of Islam, Second Edition. Volume III: H–Iram. Leiden: E. J. Brill. pp. 881–882. OCLC 495469525.
- Shaban, M. A. (1979). The Abbasid Revolution. Cambridge University Press. pp. 160–161. ISBN 0-521-29534-3.
- Zetterstéen, K. V. (1960). "ʿAbbād b. Ziyād". In Gibb, H. A. R.; Kramers, J. H.; Lévi-Provençal, E.; Schacht, J.; Lewis, B. & Pellat, Ch. (eds.). The Encyclopaedia of Islam, Second Edition. Volume I: A–B. Leiden: E. J. Brill. p. 5. OCLC 495469456.
