= Sa'id ibn Uthman =

Umayyad general and military governor of Khurasan (died c.680)

Sa'id ibn Uthman سَعِيد بْنُ عُثْمَانُ

Governor of Khurasan
- In office 675–677
- Monarch: Mu'awiya I
- Succeeded by: Aslam ibn Zur'a al-Kilabi

Personal details
- Died: c. 680
- Spouses: Ramla bint Abi Sufyan; one unnamed wife
- Children: Muhammad; A'isha; Umm Sa'id; Aban
- Parents: Uthman (father); Fatima bint al-Walid (mother)
- Relatives: Banu Umayya (clan)

Military service
- Allegiance: Uthmaniyya (656); Umayyad Caliphate (675–680)
- Battles/wars: First Fitna; Battle of the Camel; Muslim conquest of Transoxiana

Sa'id ibn Uthman ibn Affan al-Umawi (Arabic: سَعِيد بْنُ عُثْمَانُ بْنُ عَفَّان الأُمَوِيّ, romanized: Saʿīd ibn ʿUthmān ibn ʿAffān al-Umawī; died c. 680) was an Umayyad general and military governor of Khurasan in 676–677 during the reign of Caliph Mu'awiya I. He was a son of Caliph Uthman (r. 644–656) and a one-time seeker of the caliphate in 675/76.

During his short term in Khurasan, he launched a campaign deep into Transoxiana and defeated one or two Soghdian armies. He reportedly captured Bukhara and besieged Samarkand, gaining tributary status from the latter, before proceeding to capture Tirmidh. He was dismissed by Mu'awiya, possibly due to concerns that his popularity and battlefield successes had strengthened Sa'id's previous bid to seek the caliphate instead of Mu'awiya's designated successor, Yazid I (r. 680–683). He was killed in Medina by his Soghdian slaves.

== Life ==
Sa'id was a son of Caliph Uthman (r. 644–656) and the latter's wife Fatima bint al-Walid, a scion of the prominent Banu Makhzum clan of the Quraysh. Following Uthman's assassination in 656, Sa'id, alongside his brothers Aban and al-Walid, fought in the army of Aisha against Caliph Ali (r. 656–661) at the Battle of the Camel. Caliph Mu'awiya I (r. 661–680) had partly based his claim to the caliphate on his pursuit of justice for the assassination of Uthman, his Umayyad kinsman. Upon hearing news that he had nominated his son Yazid I (r. 680–683) as his successor, Sa'id left Medina for Mu'awiya's court in Damascus to petition against the decision. According to the accounts of the medieval Muslim historians al-Mada'ini (d. 843) and al-Baladhuri (d. 892), Sa'id visited Damascus to demand a high-ranking office from Mu'awiya and that the latter questioned Sa'id about rumors that he was seeking the caliphate. Sa'id, in turn, argued that because he was a son of Uthman and that his mother was a noble Qurayshite (as opposed to Yazid whose mother Maysun bint Bahdal was a Kalbite tribeswoman), he was indeed a more legitimate candidate for the caliphate than Yazid. Sa'id had been supported or encouraged to claim the office by people in Medina, including a segment of the elite Ansar faction. He may have also been quietly encouraged by Marwan ibn al-Hakam, a senior Umayyad in Medina who resented Mu'awiya's rule and sought to restore the office to the Abu al-As branch of the Umayyad clan, to which Marwan and Sa'id belonged (Mu'awiya belonged to the Sufyanid branch). Mu'awiya accepted the merit of Sa'id's arguments, though Ibn Kathir (d. 1373) holds that the caliph rejected Sa'id's assertion that he was more worthy than Yazid.

=== Governorship of Khurasan ===
Depending on the source, during his meeting with Sa'id, Mu'awiya recommended that he should take up office in Khurasan, the easternmost province of the Caliphate, or granted this to Sa'id per the latter's own request. In any event, the caliph sent Sa'id to Ubayd Allah ibn Ziyad, the governor of Basra and the eastern Caliphate, with directions to assign Sa'id commander of the conquests in Khurasan in 675/76. Per the caliph's instructions, Ibn Ziyad allotted Sa'id four million dirhams to distribute among the 4,000 soldiers under his command. Though there were capable commanders among the men assigned to Sa'id, including al-Muhallab ibn Abi Sufra, many of the troops collected were Basran prisoners and otherwise disruptive tribal elements from the population. On the way to Khurasan, Sa'id further recruited highwaymen from the Banu Tamim to join his ranks.

Mu'awiya restricted Sa'id's jurisdiction to military affairs, assigning fiscal responsibilities to Ishaq ibn Talha, who died en route to Khurasan and was replaced in the role by Aslam ibn Zur'a al-Kilabi, a Qaysite tribal leader in the Khurasan garrison and the province's former lieutenant governor. According to the historian Muhammad Shaban, Mu'awiya's deployment of Sa'id and Ishaq represented efforts to ensure that the surplus tax revenue of Khurasan, in addition to the traditional fifth of the war booty from the conquests there, was forwarded to the caliphal treasury in Damascus. This was generally opposed by the Arab tribesmen who made up the ranks of Khurasan's garrisons, who sought to keep the bulk of the provincial revenue under their control. With Ishaq's death and Aslam's virtual usurpation of the former's role, as well as Mu'awiya's efforts to keep good relations with the Qaysites so that their Syrian counterparts would accept Yazid's nomination, Sa'id was forced to work with Aslam as his partner-in-government.

After preparing his army, Sa'id launched a campaign east of the Oxus river, deeper than the previous campaign of 674 by Ibn Ziyad, and defeated a Soghdian army on the open field before capturing one of their cities and then occupying the Tirmidh fortress. The traditional Muslim histories of Abu Ubayda (d. 825), al-Baladhuri, al-Tabari (d. 923), Narshakhi (d. 959) offer varying accounts of the campaign. Al-Baladhuri and Narshakhi hold that Sa'id's crossing of the Oxus prompted Khatun, the queen of Bukhara to give allegiance to the Caliphate, but she then reneged upon the arrival of a supportive 120,000-strong army of Turks, Soghdians and soldiers from Kish and Nasaf. Sa'id's forces decisively defeated this army, entered Bukhara in triumph and, boosted by numerous defectors among the Soghdian army, besieged Samarkand for three days, after which it became a tributary of the Caliphate. Abu Ubayda also records that Sa'id besieged Samarkand. He then proceeded to capture Tirmidh and it was there that he received the tribute owed by Khatun and the allegiance of Principality of Khuttal.

=== Dismissal, death and legacy ===
Mu'awiya relieved Sa'id of his post in 677. This may have stemmed from Sa'id's growing popularity and battlefield successes, which could potentially reinforce his claims as a legitimate rival to Yazid. Ibn Asakir (d. 1176) relates that Sa'id had returned to Medina after Mu'awiya's death in 680. On his return, he took with him fifty Soghdian nobles as slaves whom he employed to work his land. He abused them by confiscating their valuables and having them dressed in wool. A number of the Soghdians then killed Sa'id, possibly with their shovels, in his walled garden before killing themselves. Marwan had attempted to rescue Sa'id, but was unable as the Soghdians had locked the garden's gate.

Sa'id had at least two wives, one of whom was Ramla (not Umm Habiba), the daughter of Mu'awiya's father and a leading figure among the Quraysh, Abu Sufyan ibn Harb; the other wife is not named in the sources. From Ramla, Sa'id had his son Muhammad, about whom nothing is known in the sources, and A'isha, who married Abd Allah, the son of Mu'awiya I. From his second wife, Sa'id had a daughter called Umm Sa'id who successively married Caliph Hisham ibn Abd al-Malik (r. 724–743), al-Abbas ibn al-Walid (son of Caliph al-Walid I, r. 705–715) and Abd al-Aziz ibn Umar (son of Caliph Umar II, r. 717–720). Another son of Sa'id recorded in the sources was Aban, whose mawla (non-Arab, Muslim freedman) was a high-ranking supporter of the Umayyad rebel Abu al-Umaytir in his early 9th-century revolt against the Abbasids, who had overthrown the Umayyads in 750.

== Bibliography ==
- Ahmed, Asad Q. (2011). The Religious Elite of the Early Islamic Ḥijāz: Five Prosopographical Case Studies. Oxford: University of Oxford Linacre College Unit for Prosopographical Research. ISBN 978-1-900934-13-8.
- Gibb, H. A. R. (1923). The Arab Conquests in Central Asia. London: The Royal Asiatic Society.
- Madelung, Wilferd (1997). The Succession to Muhammad: A Study of the Early Caliphate. Cambridge: Cambridge University Press. ISBN 0-521-56181-7.
- Madelung, Wilferd (2000). "Abūʿl-ʿAmayṭar the Sufyani". Jerusalem Studies in Arabic and Islam. 24: 327–342.
- Shaban, M. A. (1979). The 'Abbāsid Revolution. Cambridge: Cambridge University Press. ISBN 0-521-29534-3.
- Wellhausen, Julius (1927). The Arab Kingdom and Its Fall. Translated by Margaret Graham Weir. Calcutta: University of Calcutta.
