= Ishaq ibn Talha =

Isḥāq ibn Ṭalḥa ibn ʿUbayd Allāh (Arabic: إسحاق بن طلحة بن عبيد الله; died c. 676) was a member of the Muslim elite settled in Iraq under Umayyad rule and a transmitter of Muslim tradition. The caliph Mu'awiya I appointed him to oversee fiscal affairs in the vast province of Khurasan in 675 or 676, but he died on his way there. He was a son of Talha ibn Ubayd Allah and his sons and grandsons were transmitters of Muslim tradition in Medina and Kufa.

== Life ==
Ishaq was a son of Talha ibn Ubayd Allah, a prominent companion of the Islamic prophet Muhammad, and Umm Aban, the daughter of Utba ibn Rabi'a, a Qurayshite aristocrat who died fighting the Muslims at the Battle of Badr in 624. Talha died in the Battle of the Camel in 656 fighting against the forces of Caliph Ali (r. 656–661) near Basra.

Along with his full brothers Isma'il and Yahya, Ishaq settled in Kufa and enjoyed the favor of the Umayyad caliphs who came to rule Iraq from 661. He and Isma'il were among those who testified against a prominent advocate of Ali's family, Hujr ibn Adi, who was executed in 671 by the Umayyad caliph Mu'awiya I (r. 661–680). Ishaq promised Mu'awiya to marry off his sister Umm Ishaq to Mu'awiya's son and chosen successor Yazid I (r. 680–683). He ultimately wed her to Hasan, Ali's son and successor in Kufa who had been deposed by Mu'awiya. The affair led to Yazid's hostility toward the family of Talha during his reign.

According to one account, Mu'awiya appointed Ishaq, his maternal kinsman whom he considered a loyalist, to administer fiscal affairs in Khurasan in 675 alongside Aslam ibn Zur'a al-Kilabi, who was charged with military affairs. Ishaq died on the way to Khurasan and his responsibilities were taken over by Aslam unilaterally. In another account Ishaq was appointed to the same role alongside Sa'id ibn Uthman, who served as governor in 676. He died in Rayy, where his tomb is mentioned by the Sufi traveler al-Harawi (d. 1215).

== Descendants ==
Ishaq married Umm Unas, a daughter of Abu Musa al-Ash'ari, who had served as governor of Kufa. His brother Yahya also married a daughter of Abu Musa. Umm Unas bore him a son, Abdallah, about whom nothing is known in the sources. Abdallah's son Musa and grandson Salih were narrators of Islamic tradition from Medina and Kufa, respectively, while another son of Ishaq, Mu'awiya, and a grandson, Salih ibn Musa, were also transmitters from Kufa. These descendants of Ishaq apparently did not have the favor of the later Umayyad and Abbasid caliphs.

== Bibliography ==
- Ahmed, Asad Q. (2011). The Religious Elite of the Early Islamic Ḥijāz: Five Prosopographical Case Studies. Oxford: University of Oxford Linacre College Unit for Prosopographical Research. ISBN 978-1-900934-13-8.
- Blankinship, Khalid Yahya, ed. (1993). The History of al-Ṭabarī, Volume XI: The Challenge to the Empires. SUNY Series in Near Eastern Studies. Albany, New York: State University of New York Press. ISBN 978-0-7914-0851-3.
- Bosworth, C. E. (1968). Sīstān under the Arabs: From the Islamic Conquest to the Rise of the Ṣaffārids (30–250, 651–864). Rome: Istituto italiano per il Medio ed Estremo Oriente. OCLC 956878036.
- Meri, Josef W. (2004). ʻAlī Ibn Abī Bakr Al-Harawī's Kitāb Al-Ishārāt Ilā Maʻrifat Al-Ziyārāt. Darwin Press.
- Morony, Michael G., ed. (1987). The History of al-Ṭabarī, Volume XVIII: Between Civil Wars: The Caliphate of Muʿāwiyah, 661–680 A.D./A.H. 40–60. SUNY Series in Near Eastern Studies. Albany, New York: State University of New York Press. ISBN 978-0-87395-933-9.
- Shaban, M. A. (1970). The Abbasid Revolution. Cambridge University Press. ISBN 0-521-29534-3.
