= Nezak Tarkhan =

Nomadic ruler of Tokharistan (died c. 710)

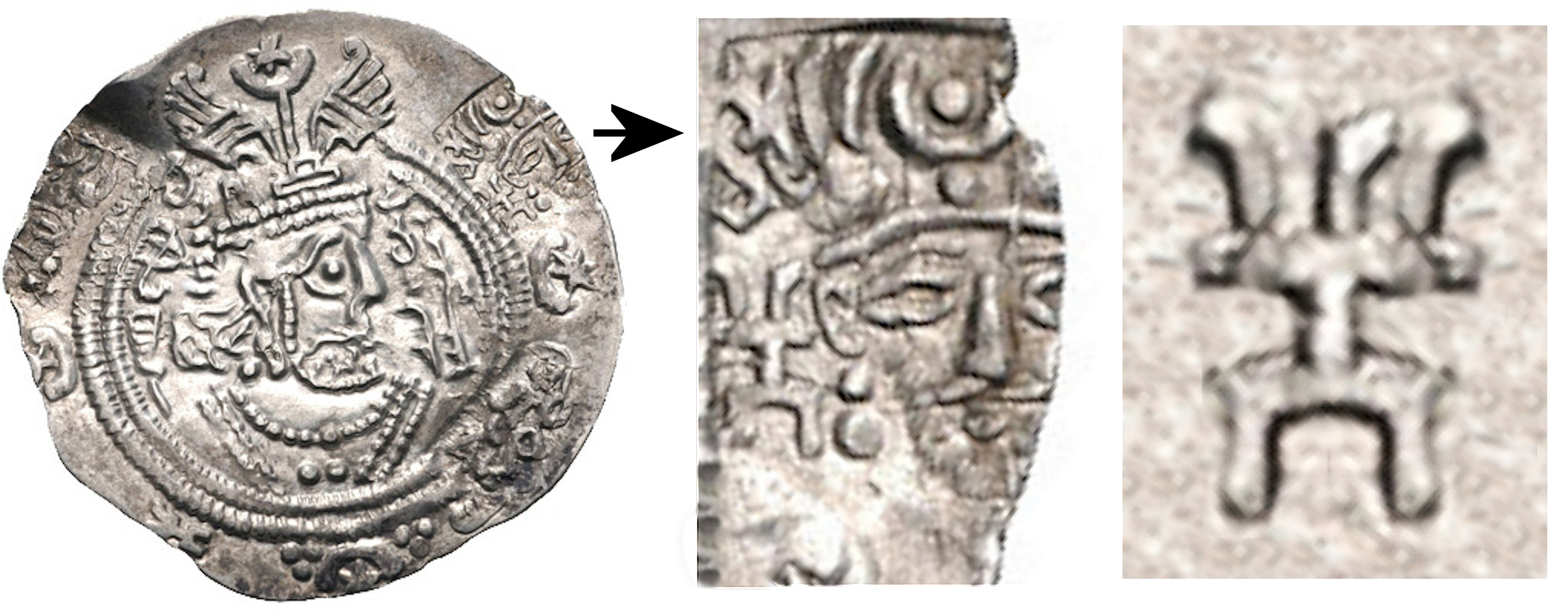
Hephthalite copy of a Sasano-Arab coin of Abd Allah ibn Khazim with AH 69 (688 CE) date. In the margin: a Hephthalite countermark with crowned facing head and a late tamgha. Time of Nezak Tarkhan, circa 700 CE.

Nezak Tarkhan or Tarkhan Nizak (-710 CE) was a nomadic ruler of Tokharistan who led a revolt against the Arab commander Qutayba bin Muslim around 709 CE. He is sometimes considered as the last Hephthalite ruler, ruling from his castle in Balkh.

Nezak Tarkhan is first mentioned in 651 CE as the Hephthalite ruler of Badghis, when he allied with the marzban of Merv against the Sasanian ruler Yazdegerd III. Yazdegerd III was defeated and barely escaped with his life, but he was murdered in the vicinity of Merv soon after, and the Arabs managed to capture the city of Merv the same year.

In 659, Chinese chronicles still mentioned the "Hephtalite Tarkhans" (悒達太汗 Yida Taihan, probably related to "Nezak Tarkhan"), as some of the rulers in Tokharistan who remained theoretically subjects to the Chinese Empire, and whose main city was Huolu 活路 (modern Mazār-e Sherif, Afghanistan). Yaqut al-Hamawi called Badghis "the headquarters of the Hephthalites" (dār mamlakat al-Hayāṭela).

Thâbit and Hurayth ibn Qutba, who were brothers and leaders of the merchant community of Merv, allied with Arab rebel and ruler of Termez, Musa ibn Abd Allah ibn Khazim, who was the son of the Zubayrid governor of Khurasan Abd Allah ibn Khazim al-Sulami, against the forces of the Umayyad Caliphate. This alliance expanded to include Nezak, as well as the Hepthalite princes of Transoxiania and Tukharistan. They rebelled and Musa drove out the Umayyads from Transoxiania. While Musa's allies suggested to him to conquer all of Khorasan, his Arab allies told him to only take over Transoxiana, which he achieved. The Umayyad forces under Yazid ibn al-Muhallab however defeated this alliance, defeating Nezak in Badghis in 703 and capturing Termez from Musa in 704.

Nezak Tarkhan, the ruler of the Hephthalites of Badghis, led a new revolt in 709 with the support of other principalities as well as his nominal ruler, the Yabghu of Tokharistan. In 710, the Umayyad general Qutaiba ibn Muslim was able to re-establish Muslim control over Tokharistan and captured Nizak Tarkhan, who was executed on the orders of al-Hajjaj ibn Yusuf, despite promises of pardon, while the Yabghu was exiled to Damascus and kept there as a hostage.

According to some authors, he may have been of Nezak descent and "Nezak Tarkhan" was a title of multiple rulers encountered by the Muslims rather than a personal name.

== Sources ==
- Beckwith, Christopher (2009). Empires of the Silk Road. Princeton University Press. ISBN 978-0-691-13589-2.
- Gibb, H. A. R. (1923). The Arab Conquests in Central Asia. London: The Royal Asiatic Society. OCLC 499987512.
- Kennedy, Hugh (2007). The Great Arab Conquests: How the Spread of Islam Changed the World We Live In. Philadelphia, Pennsylvania: Da Capo Press. ISBN 978-0-306-81740-3.
- Shaban, M. A. (1970). The ʿAbbāsid Revolution. Cambridge: Cambridge University Press. ISBN 0-521-29534-3.
