= Sa'id ibn Aslam al-Kilabi =

Sa'id ibn Aslam ibn Zur'a al-Kilabi (Arabic: سعيد بن أسلم بن زرعة الكلابي) was the governor of Makran, i.e. the eastern frontier of the Umayyad Caliphate under al-Hajjaj ibn Yusuf, overall governor of Iraq and the eastern caliphate, in 694. He was the son of Aslam ibn Zur'a, a chief of the Banu Kilab tribe, leader of the Qays faction in the Muslim armies of Basra and Khurasan, and governor of Khurasan in 677–679. When most of al-Hajjaj's Basran troops mutinied against him at his camp in Rustuqubadh in Ahwaz after he announced a cut to their stipends, Sa'id was among those who remained loyal to him, for which he was rewarded with the governorship of Makran. Not long after taking up his post, he was killed in an attack by Muhammad and Mu'awiya, two sons of al-Harith al-Ilafi, who afterward assumed control of the frontier region. According to al-Baladhuri (d. 892), al-Hajjaj sent Mujja'a ibn Si'r as Sa'id's replacement. In the wake of Sa'id's death, al-Hajjaj adopted his son Muslim, raising him with his own children. Muslim later served as governor of Khurasan.

== Bibliography ==
- Caskel, Werner (1966). Ğamharat an-nasab: Das genealogische Werk des His̆ām ibn Muḥammad al-Kalbī, Volume II (in German). Leiden: Brill.
- Chowdhry, Shiv Rai (1972). Al-Ḥajjāj ibn Yūsuf (An Examination of His Works and Personality) (Thesis). University of Delhi.
- Crone, Patricia (1980). Slaves on Horses: The Evolution of the Islamic Polity. Cambridge: Cambridge University Press. ISBN 0-521-52940-9.
- Murgotten, Francis Clark (1924). The Origins of the Islamic State, Being a Translation from the Arabic, Accompanied with Annotations, Geographic and Historic Notes of the Kitâb Fitûh al-Buldân of al-Imâm Abu-l Abbâs Ahmad Ibn-Jâbir al-Balâdhuri, Volume 2. New York: Columbia University.
