= Salm ibn Ziyad =

Umayyad general and statesman (died 692)

Salm ibn Ziyad ibn Abihi
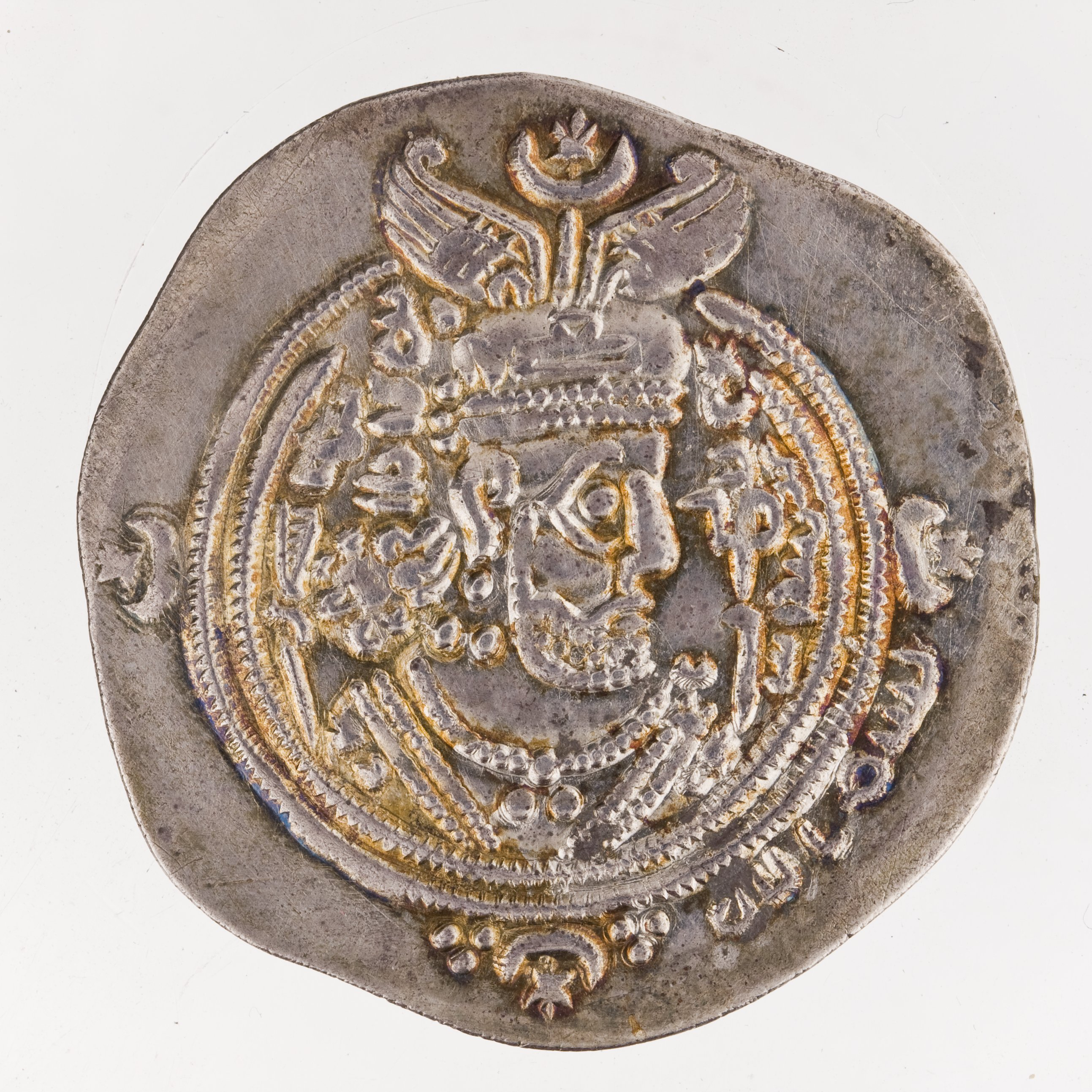
- A Sasanian-style silver dirham of Salm ibn Ziyad minted in Merv, Khurasan in 682/83

Umayyad governor of Khurasan and Sijistan
- In office 681–684
- Monarch: Yazid I
- Preceded by: Abd al-Rahman ibn Ziyad (Khurasan); Abbad ibn Ziyad (Sijistan)
- Succeeded by: Abd Allah ibn Khazim al-Sulami

Personal details
- Died: Late 692; Basra
- Spouse: Umm Muhammad bint Abd Allah ibn Uthman ibn Abi'l-As al-Thaqafi
- Children: Sughdi; Muharib
- Parent: Ziyad ibn Abihi

Abū Ḥarb Salm ibn Ziyād ibn Abīhi (Arabic: سلم بن زياد) (died late 692) was a general and statesman of the Umayyad Caliphate, who later defected to the caliphate of Abd Allah ibn al-Zubayr during the Second Muslim Civil War before returning to the Umayyads' ranks. Salm was appointed by Caliph Yazid I (r. 680–683) as the governor of Khurasan and Sijistan in 681. During the course of his governorship, he launched several expeditionary raids into the Central Asian regions of Transoxiana, including Samarkand, and Khwarazm. His successes and generous distribution of war booty among his Khurasani Arab troops gained him wide popularity with them, but after Yazid died, Salm was not able to maintain their loyalty to the Umayyads for long. After his troops and chosen successor, Abd Allah ibn Khazim al-Sulami, gave their allegiance to the rival caliphate of Abd Allah ibn al-Zubayr, Salm made for Basra. There, he ultimately joined Ibn al-Zubayr's camp, but was imprisoned in Mecca by the latter nonetheless. After paying a large bribe, he was released and following Ibn al-Zubayr's death at the hands of the Umayyads in late 692, he was reappointed the governor of Khurasan. However, he died before he could resume his duties.

== Life ==
Salm was the third eldest son of Ziyad ibn Abihi, the Umayyad governor of Iraq and virtual viceroy of the eastern part of the caliphate. By the time of Ziyad's death in 673, his family maintained a strong footing in the eastern caliphate; Ziyad was replaced with Salm's brothers Ubayd Allah in Iraq, Abd al-Rahman in Khurasan, and Abbad in Sijistan. A year after Yazid I succeeded his father Mu'awiya I as caliph in 680, he appointed Salm governor of Khurasan and Sijistan in place of his brothers. In turn, Salm appointed another of the brothers, Yazid, as his deputy governor in Sijistan. Prior to his arrival at the provincial capital at Merv, Salm assembled a select force of 2,000 tribesmen at Basra, among which were several leading Arab nobles, including the veterans al-Muhallab ibn Abi Sufra of Azd, Abd Allah ibn Khazim of Banu Sulaym, Talha ibn Abdillah of Khuza'a and Umar ibn Ubayd Allah ibn Ma'mar of Banu Tamim.

One of Salm's first actions upon arriving at Merv was the arrest and public condemnation of the powerful Arab chieftain Qays ibn al-Haytham al-Sulami, who had been empowered by Salm's brother Abd al-Rahman. According to historian Muhammad Abdulhayy Shaban, his arrest was an effort by Salm to gain the support of the influential chieftain Aslam ibn Zur'a al-Kilabi, who had been imprisoned and extorted by Qays, and to signal a departure of Abd al-Rahman's policy of redirecting the revenues of Khurasan to Damascus instead of among the province's troops for expeditions. Depending on the source, Salm either sent Caliph Yazid one-fifth of the war booty his forces acquired with the rest distributed among the troops or he distributed all of the booty between himself and the troops. As a result of this policy and successes on the battlefield, Salm gained wide popularity among the troops. Indeed, the 9th-century historian al-Tabari recorded:

"The people of Khurasan never loved a governor as they loved Salm [ibn] Ziyad. In those two years when Salm was there, more than 20,000 children were named Salm because of their love for Salm." — Ali ibn Muhammad, a certain Arab shaykh (tribal chieftain) from Khurasan cited by al-Tabari.

Salm scored victories and gains during his raids across the Oxus River against the Soghdian princes of Transoxiana and Samarkand in Central Asia. He is credited as the first Arab commander to encamp in territory east of the Oxus during the winter. Previously, the Arab armies, which had been crossing east of the Oxus from 671, refrained from camping there in the winter because they were unaccustomed to the severe Central Asian cold and the consequent need for heavier, warm clothing. His wife, Umm Muhammad bint Abd Allah, a granddaughter of Uthman ibn Abi'l-As al-Thaqafi, crossed with him and became the first Arab woman to cross the Oxus. She gave birth to one of his sons, whom they named Sughdi in honor of his birthplace, Sogdhia.

Salm also led raids into the Khwarazm. However, his deputies in Sijistan and Zabulistan, the latter under the command of his brother Abu Ubayda, were not able to emulate Salm's successes in the region that corresponds with modern-day Afghanistan. There, the Zunbils of Zabulistan and the shahs of Kabul put up stiff resistance against the Arabs, and Yazid and Abu Ubayda were ultimately slain and captured, respectively, during military expeditions against them.

Following Caliph Yazid's death and the chaos that ensued due to the uncertainty of leadership in the Umayyad capital in Syria, Salm initially maintained the allegiance of Khurasan's Arab troops to the Umayyads. However, they soon after defected and Salm was forced to abandon the province for his brother Ubayd Allah's headquarters in Basra. His chosen successor, Abd Allah ibn Khazim al-Sulami, meanwhile emerged to dominate the eastern caliphate and paid allegiance to the anti-Umayyad, Mecca-based claimant to the caliphate, Abd Allah ibn al-Zubayr. Unlike Ubayd Allah, Salm decided to join Ibn al-Zubayr's cause, but Zubayrid loyalists nonetheless arrested him in Basra and brought him to Mecca where he was held captive. Ibn al-Zubayr had extorted Salm, who ultimately paid the former four million dirhams, which he acquired in the course of his governorship over Khurasan, to secure his freedom. He remained in Mecca until the Umayyad general al-Hajjaj ibn Yusuf besieged Ibn al-Zubayr. Salm was pardoned by the Umayyad caliph Abd al-Malik, who restored him as governor of Khurasan. However, before he could reach the province, Salm died in Basra in 692. A grandson of Salm, Maslama ibn Muharib ibn Salm (died between 765–785), was a Basra-based historian whose reports were used in the histories of 9th-century historians al-Mada'ini and al-Tabari.

== Bibliography ==
- Bosworth, C. E. (1968). Sīstān under the Arabs : from the Islamic conquest to the rise of the Ṣaffārids (30-250, 651-864). Rome: Istituto italiano per il Medio ed Estremo Oriente.
- Bosworth, C. E. (1995). "Salm b. Ziyād b. Abīhi". In Bosworth, C. E.; van Donzel, E.; Heinrichs, W. P. & Lecomte, G. (eds.). The Encyclopaedia of Islam, Second Edition. Volume VIII: Ned–Sam. Leiden: E. J. Brill. p. 997. ISBN 978-90-04-09834-3.
- Howard, I. K. A., ed. (1990). The History of al-Ṭabarī, Volume XIX: The Caliphate of Yazīd ibn Muʿāwiyah, A.D. 680–683/A.H. 60–64. SUNY Series in Near Eastern Studies. Albany, New York: State University of New York Press. ISBN 978-0-7914-0040-1.
- Hawting, G. R., ed. (1989). The History of al-Ṭabarī, Volume XX: The Collapse of Sufyānid Authority and the Coming of the Marwānids: The Caliphates of Muʿāwiyah II and Marwān I and the Beginning of the Caliphate of ʿAbd al-Malik, A.D. 683–685/A.H. 64–66. SUNY Series in Near Eastern Studies. Albany, New York: State University of New York Press. ISBN 978-0-88706-855-3.
- Levy, Reuben (2000). Orientalism: Early Sources, Volume 12: The Social Structure of Islam (2nd ed.). Routledge. ISBN 0-415-20910-2.
- McAuliffe, Jane Dammen, ed. (1995). The History of al-Ṭabarī, Volume XXVIII: The ʿAbbāsid Authority Affirmed: The Early Years of al-Mansūr, A.D. 753–763/A.H. 136–145. SUNY Series in Near Eastern Studies. Albany, New York: State University of New York Press. ISBN 978-0-7914-1895-6.
- Shaban, M. A. (1970). The Abbasid Revolution. Cambridge University Press. pp. 160–161. ISBN 0-521-29534-3.
