= Al-Hakam ibn Amr al-Ghifari =

Governor of Khurasan
- In office 665–Unknown

Personal details
- Died: Merv (present-day Bayramaly, Turkmenistan)
- Resting place: Merv
- Relations: Rafi (brother)
- Parent: Amr ibn Mujaddah (father)

Al-Hakam ibn Amr al-Ghifari (Arabic: الحكم بن عمرو الغفاري) (d. 670/71), was a companion of the Islamic prophet Muhammad and the Umayyad governor of Khurasan and commander of Arab expeditions into Transoxiana (Central Asia) from 665 until his death in Merv.

== Life ==
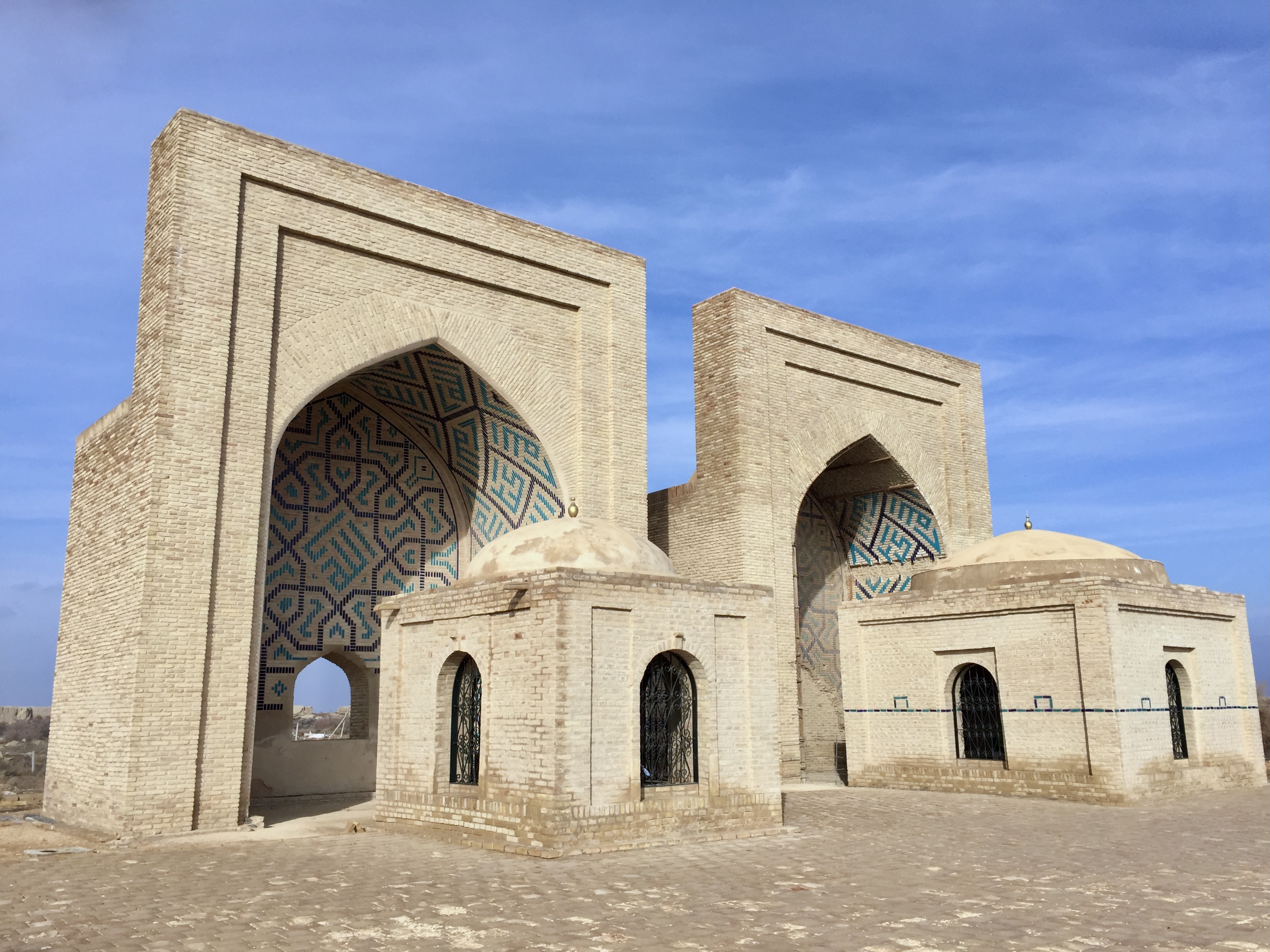
Resting place of al-Ghifari alongside Buraydah al-Aslami, Merv, Turkmenistan

Al-Hakam ibn Amr was a son of Amr ibn Mujaddah ibn Hidhyam ibn al-Harith ibn Nu'ayla of the Banu Ghifar, a clan of the Kinana tribe. Al-Hakam was a companion of the Islamic prophet Muhammad and one of his banner bearers in battle. He settled in Basra, the Arab garrison town and springboard of the Muslim conquests of the Sasanian Empire established in 636. There was a sparse presence of Ghifar tribesmen in Basra. His brother Rafi was a transmitter of hadith from Muhammad.

According to al-Tabari and al-Baladhuri, in 665 Ziyad ibn Abihi, the practical viceroy of Iraq and the eastern Umayyad Caliphate, centralized the vast region of Khurasan (east of Iran and west of the Oxus) into a single provincial administration based in Merv under the governorship of al-Hakam. According to an anecdote cited by both historians, Ziyad had intended to appoint the veteran commander al-Hakam ibn Abi al-As al-Thaqafi to the post, but when his chamberlain mistakenly brought al-Hakam ibn Amr to his court he appointed him instead, remarking that al-Hakam was a companion of Muhammad and "an upright fellow" or "a man of nobility". Another traditional Muslim report holds that al-Hakam was appointed by Ziyad in 664. Al-Tabari notes that Ziyad also assigned six deputies under al-Hakam charged with the collection of the kharaj (land tax and/or possibly poll tax).

Al-Hakam died and was buried in Merv. His appointed successor Anas ibn Abi Unas, who was promptly dismissed by Ziyad, led his funeral prayers. His grave was mentioned by the sources as late as the reign of the Abbasid caliph al-Ma'mun (r. 813–833).

== Bibliography ==
- Crone, Patricia (1980). Slaves on Horses: The Evolution of the Islamic Polity (1980 ed.). Cambridge: Cambridge University Press. ISBN 978-0521229616.
- Fariq, K. A. (1966). Ziyād b. Abīh. London: Asia Publishing House. OCLC 581630755.
- Gibb, H. A. R. (1923). The Arab Conquests in Central Asia. London: The Royal Asiatic Society.
- Hasan, S. A. (1970). "A Survey of the Expansion of Islam into Central Asia during the Umayyad Caliphate". Islamic Culture. 44 (1): 165–176.
- Landau-Tasseron, Ella, ed. (1998). The History of al-Ṭabarī, Volume XXXIX: Biographies of the Prophet's Companions and their Successors: al-Ṭabarī's Supplement to his History. SUNY Series in Near Eastern Studies. Albany, New York: State University of New York Press. ISBN 978-0-7914-2819-1.
- Lecker, Michael (2000). "On the Burial of Martyrs in Islam". In Hiroyuki, Yanagihashi (ed.). The Concept of Territory in Islamic Law and Thought. London: Kegan Paul International. pp. 37–50. ISBN 0-7103-0725X.
- Murgotten, Francis Clark (1924). The Origins of the Islamic State, Being a Translation from the Arabic, Accompanied with Annotations, Geographic and Historic Notes of the Kitâb Fitûh al-Buldân of al-Imâm Abu-l Abbâs Ahmad Ibn-Jâbir al-Balâdhuri, Part 2. New York and London: Columbia University & Longman, Green & Co.
- Morony, Michael G., ed. (1987). The History of al-Ṭabarī, Volume XVIII: Between Civil Wars: The Caliphate of Muʿāwiyah, 661–680 A.D./A.H. 40–60. SUNY Series in Near Eastern Studies. Albany, New York: State University of New York Press. ISBN 978-0-87395-933-9.
- Rtveladze, Edward V. (2000). "Migration of Peoples in Central Asia". JCAS Symposium Series (9): 1–20.
