= Muslim ibn Sa'id al-Kilabi =

Umayyad Governor of Khurasan from 723 to 724

Muslim ibn Sa'id ibn Aslam ibn Zur'ah ibn Amr ibn Khuwaylid al-Sa'iq al-Kilabi (Arabic: مسلم بن سعيد الكلابي) was governor of Khurasan for the Umayyad Caliphate in 723–724. He is best known for his efforts to conciliate the native population of Transoxiana and for the major military defeat at the "Day of Thirst" against the Türgesh.

== Life ==
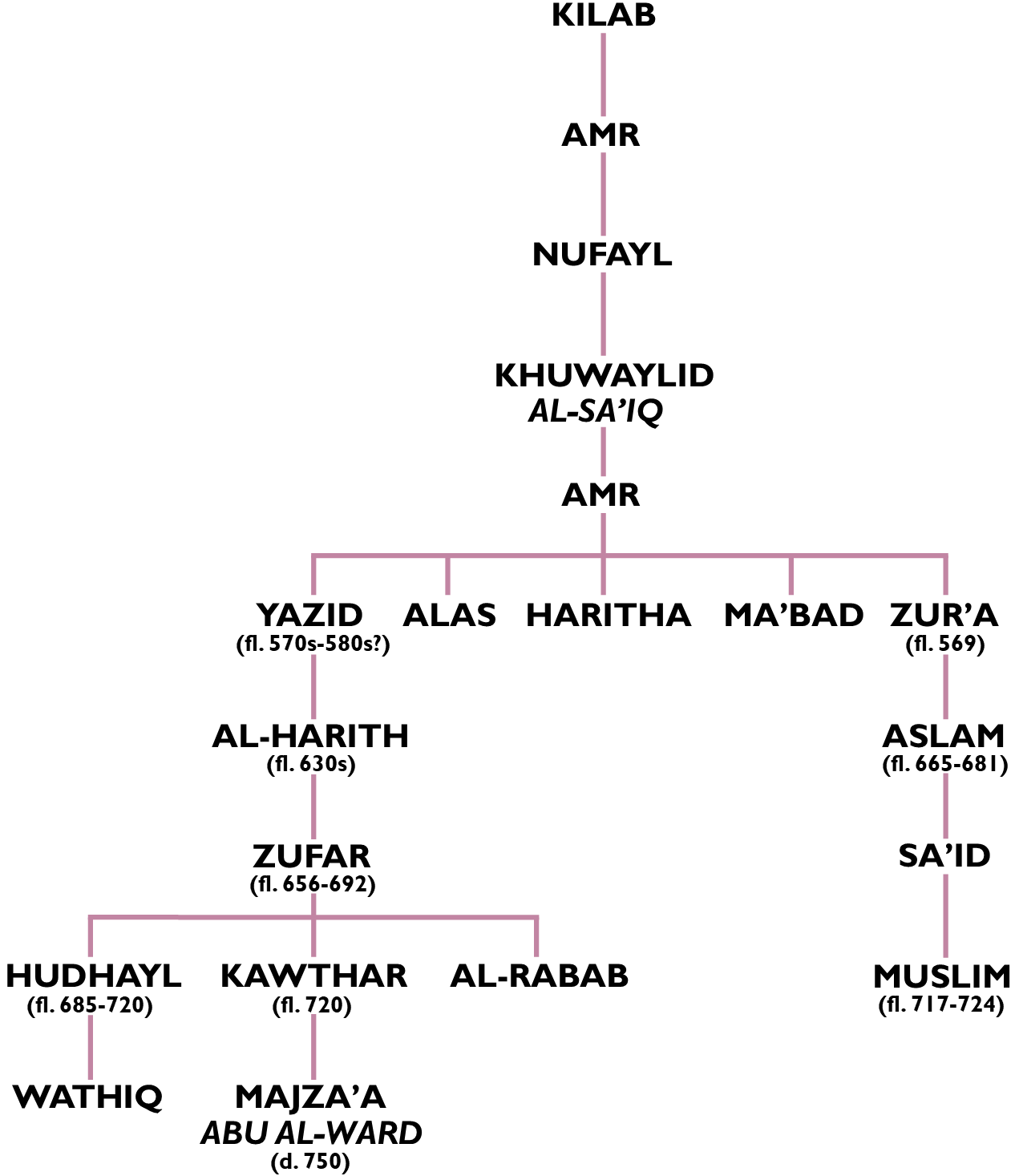
Muslim had a distinguished ancestry, being a descendant of a family of chieftains from the Amr branch of the Banu Kilab. He and his grandfather Aslam ibn Zur'a served as governors of Khurasan under the Umayyads

Muslim had a distinguished ancestry: his grandfather Aslam served as governor of Khurasan in 671–675, and his father Sa'id was a partisan of the powerful governor of Iraq, al-Hajjaj ibn Yusuf, who rewarded his loyalty by appointing him as governor of Makran. They were the Basran branch of a clan of the Kilab tribe that was mostly concentrated in the Jazira (Upper Mesopotamia) (see Zufar ibn al-Harith al-Kilabi).

When his father was killed during his governorship, Muslim was raised as a foster-son by al-Hajjaj, alongside his own sons. His first official post was as a provincial sub-governor under the governor of Basra, Adi ibn Artat, and he reportedly acquitted himself well. During the rebellion of Yazid ibn al-Muhallab in 720, he fled to Syria carrying the province's tax revenues with him.

Muslim became a companion to the governor of Iraq, Umar ibn Hubayra, who in 722/723 appointed him as governor of Khurasan, replacing Sa'id ibn Amr al-Harashi. He took office at a sensitive time, as widespread unrest among the native Iranian and Turkic populations of newly conquered Transoxiana had been brutally suppressed by al-Harashi. When appointing him to the post, Ibn Hubayra advised him to seek conciliation with the native populations, and especially the converts (mawali). Indeed, al-Kilabi appointed officials that would be acceptable to the locals, such as Bahram Sis, a Zoroastrian who was appointed as marzban of Merv.

In the next year, he resolved to launch an expedition with the goal of seizing the Ferghana Valley, which had been lost during the unrest of the previous years. The campaign faced difficulties already in its early stages, when the news arrived of the accession of a new Caliph, Hisham ibn Abd al-Malik, and the appointment of a new governor of Iraq, Khalid al-Qasri. This brought the long-simmering tribal rivalries of the Arabs of Khurasan came to the fore: anticipating the immediate recall of al-Kilabi, the Yemeni (southern Arab) troops in Balkh refused to join the campaign, and had to be coerced by a force of Mudaris (northern Arabs) under Nasr ibn Sayyar, who clashed with them at Baruqan. The campaign eventually went ahead as Khalid al-Qasri wrote to al-Kilabi, urging him to proceed with it until his replacement, Khalid's brother Asad, arrived in Khurasan.

Al-Kilabi moved his army up the Jaxartes valley to Ferghana and laid siege to its main settlement, but news of the approach of the Türgesh forced him to hastily retreat south. After several days, with the Türgesh in close pursuit, the Umayyad army found its path blocked by the native princes who had allied with the Türgesh. In the so-called "Day of Thirst", the Arabs were forced to break through the enemy lines to cross the Jaxartes and reach safety, suffering heavy casualties in the process. Al-Kilabi surrendered the leadership of the army to Abd al-Rahman ibn Na'im al-Ghamidi, who led the remnants of the army back to Samarkand. This debacle led to the almost complete collapse of Muslim rule in Transoxiana over the next few years.

Some of the Khurasani Arabs are said to have lashed Muslim after his dismissal, for his role in causing the battle at Baruqan, but al-Ghamidi interceded to make them stop. His successor, Asad al-Qasri, treated him well, and allowed him to return to Iraq.

== Sources ==
- Blankinship, Khalid Yahya, ed. (1989). The History of al-Ṭabarī, Volume XXV: The End of Expansion: The Caliphate of Hishām, A.D. 724–738/A.H. 105–120. SUNY Series in Near Eastern Studies. Albany, New York: State University of New York Press. ISBN 978-0-88706-569-9.
- Blankinship, Khalid Yahya (1994). The End of the Jihâd State: The Reign of Hishām ibn ʻAbd al-Malik and the Collapse of the Umayyads. Albany, New York: State University of New York Press. ISBN 978-0-7914-1827-7.
- Crone, Patricia (1980). Slaves on Horses: The Evolution of the Islamic Polity. Cambridge: Cambridge University Press. ISBN 0-521-52940-9.
- Gibb, H. A. R. (1923). The Arab Conquests in Central Asia. London: The Royal Asiatic Society. OCLC 499987512.
- Hillenbrand, Carole, ed. (1989). The History of al-Ṭabarī, Volume XXVI: The Waning of the Umayyad Caliphate: Prelude to Revolution, A.D. 738–744/A.H. 121–126. SUNY Series in Near Eastern Studies. Albany, New York: State University of New York Press. ISBN 978-0-88706-810-2.
- Powers, David S., ed. (1989). The History of al-Ṭabarī, Volume XXIV: The Empire in Transition: The Caliphates of Sulaymān, ʿUmar, and Yazīd, A.D. 715–724/A.H. 96–105. SUNY Series in Near Eastern Studies. Albany, New York: State University of New York Press. ISBN 978-0-7914-0072-2.

Preceded by Sa'id ibn Amr al-Harashi	Umayyad governor of Khurasan; 723–724	Succeeded by Asad ibn Abdallah al-Qasri
