= Abd al-Rahman ibn Ziyad =

Umayyad governor of Khurasan in 678/79–681

Abd al-Rahman ibn Ziyad ibn Abihi

Umayyad governor of Khurasan
- In office 678/79–681
- Monarchs: Mu'awiya I (661–680); Yazid I (680–683)
- Preceded by: Aslam ibn Zur'a
- Succeeded by: Salm ibn Ziyad

Personal details
- Died: Basra
- Parents: Ziyad ibn Abihi (father); Mu'adha bint Sakhr al-Uqayliyya (mother)

ʿAbd al-Raḥmān ibn Ziyād ibn Abīhi (Arabic: عبدالرحمن بن زياد) was the Umayyad governor of Khurasan in 678/79–681. He is credited for reasserting Umayyad authority over the Arab tribesmen who garrisoned the province and ensuring the flow of Khurasan’s revenues and tribute to the Umayyad treasury in Damascus.

== Life ==
Abd al-Rahman was an elder son of Ziyad ibn Abihi the Umayyad governor of Iraq and virtual viceroy of the eastern parts of the caliphate. Abd al-Rahman was appointed by Caliph Mu'awiya I as governor of Khurasan, at a time concurrent with his brother Ubayd Allah's governorship of Iraq and its eastern dependencies, which included Khurasan. Abd al-Rahman was tasked with restoring order to the Arab tribesmen who garrisoned the province and bringing them into line with the Umayyads' plans for eastward expansion. Under the virtual governorship of Aslam ibn Zur'a al-Kilabi, the Arabs had not launched any military expeditions for two years. Abd al-Rahman dispatched one of his commanders, Qays ibn al-Haytham al-Sulami, to confront Aslam and the latter was consequently imprisoned and forced to surrender 300,000 silver dirhams to the authorities.

Abd al-Rahman remained in office for two years until being replaced with his brother Salm in 681 shortly after the accession of Caliph Yazid I. In the course of his governorship, Abd al-Rahman did not launch any expeditions but succeeded in asserting control over the Arab troops of Khurasan and collecting unpaid tribute and revenues on behalf of Damascus. In a testament to his success, he was able to set aside from the collected sums twenty millions dirhams for himself, though this figure is likely an exaggeration by the sources, according to historian Muhammad Abdulhayy Shaban. According to 9th-century historian al-Baladhuri, Abd al-Rahman retired to Basra, where he maintained a daily spending of 1,000 dirhams and died at the age of 100.

== Bibliography ==
- Bosworth, C. E. (1968). Sīstān under the Arabs : from the Islamic conquest to the rise of the Ṣaffārids (30-250, 651-864). Rome: Istituto italiano per il Medio ed Estremo Oriente.
- Fariq, K. A. (1966). Ziyād b. Abīh. London: Asia Publishing House. OCLC 581630755.
- Howard, I. K. A., ed. (1990). The History of al-Ṭabarī, Volume XIX: The Caliphate of Yazīd ibn Muʿāwiyah, A.D. 680–683/A.H. 60–64. SUNY Series in Near Eastern Studies. Albany, New York: State University of New York Press. ISBN 978-0-7914-0040-1.
- Shaban, M. A. (1979). The Abbasid Revolution. Cambridge University Press. pp. 160–161. ISBN 0-521-29534-3.
