= Yazid ibn Ziyad =

Umayyad General and governor in 680s

Yazīd ibn Ziyād ibn Abīhi (Arabic: يزيد بن زياد بن أبيه) (died 683/84) was a general of the Umayyad Caliphate responsible for the province of Sijistan during the reign of Caliph Yazid I between 680/81 and his death. He was appointed by one of his brothers Ubayd Allah or Salm in 680 or 681 in their capacity as governors of Basra or Khurasan, respectively. While Yazid was posted as amir (overall commander, probably with fiscal and civil responsibilities) of Sijistan, his brother Abu Ubayda was made field commander. In 683/84, the two brothers led an expedition against the Zunbil of Zabulistan and the Turk Shahis of Kabul. However, their forces were routed and Yazid was slain, while Abu Ubayda was captured.

== Bibliography ==
- Bosworth, C. E. (1968). Sīstān under the Arabs : from the Islamic conquest to the rise of the Ṣaffārids (30-250, 651-864). Rome: Istituto italiano per il Medio ed Estremo Oriente.
- Howard, I. K. A., ed. (1990). The History of al-Ṭabarī, Volume XIX: The Caliphate of Yazīd ibn Muʿāwiyah, A.D. 680–683/A.H. 60–64. SUNY Series in Near Eastern Studies. Albany, New York: State University of New York Press. ISBN 978-0-7914-0040-1.
