= Ziyad ibn Abihi =

Arab administrator and statesman (c. 622 – 673)

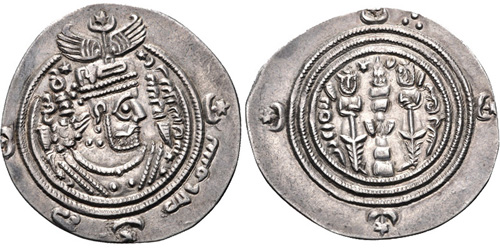
- Sasanian-style silver dirham, struck in the name of "Ziyad ibn Abi Sufyan"

Umayyad governor of Basra
- In office June/July 665–670
- Monarch: Mu'awiya I
- Preceded by: Al-Harith ibn Abd Allah (Note: Al-Harith ibn Abd Allah al-Azdi served four months as governor of Basra and had been appointed effectively as a placeholder in between the dismissal of Abd Allah ibn Amir and the appointment of Ziyad.)

Umayyad governor of Iraq
- In office 670–673
- Monarch: Mu'awiya I
- Preceded by: Office established
- Succeeded by: Abd Allah ibn Khalid (in Kufa); Samura ibn Jundab (in Basra)

Personal details
- Born: c. 622
- Died: 23 August 673 al-Thawiyya near Kufa
- Spouses: Mu'adha bint Sakhr al-Uqayliyya; Marjana (or Manjana); Daughter of Muhajir ibn Hakim ibn Taliq; Daughter of al-Qa'qa' ibn Ma'bad ibn Zurara al-Darimiyya; Lubaba bint Awf al-Harashiyya
- Children: Muhammad; Abd al-Rahman; Ubayd Allah; Salm; Abbad; Yazid; Abu Ubayda; Uthman; Umm Habib (daughter); Ramla (daughter); Sakhra (daughter)
- Parent: Sumayya (mother)

Abu al-Mughira Ziyad ibn Abihi (Arabic: أبو المغيرة زياد بن أبيه, romanized: Abū al-Mughīra Ziyād ibn Abīhi; c. 622–673), also known as Ziyad ibn Abi Sufyan (Arabic: زياد بن أبي سفيان, romanized: Ziyād ibn Abī Sufyān), was an administrator and statesman of the successive Rashidun and Umayyad caliphates in the mid-7th century. He served as the governor of Basra in 665–670 and ultimately the first governor of Iraq and practical viceroy of the eastern Caliphate between 670 and his death.

Ziyad's parentage is obscure, but he was raised among the Banu Thaqif in Ta'if, near Mecca. He arrived with his adoptive tribesmen in Basra upon its foundation in 636 as the Muslim Arabs' springboard for the conquest of the Sasanian Empire. He was initially employed by the city's first governor, Utba ibn Ghazwan al-Mazini, and was kept on as a scribe or secretary by his successors. Caliph Ali (r. 656–661) appointed Ziyad governor of Fars to suppress a local rebellion and he maintained his loyalty to Ali's caliphate after the latter's assassination in 661 and the subsequent rule of Ali's opponent, Mu'awiya I (r. 661–680). The latter overcame Ziyad's opposition, formally recognized him as his own paternal half-brother and appointed him governor of Basra. Ziyad's inaugural speech, in which he announced his carrot-and-stick approach to governing the city's turbulent population, is celebrated in Arab history for its eloquence.

After the death of Kufa's governor, Ziyad's mentor al-Mughira ibn Shu'ba, Mu'awiya made Ziyad the first governor of a unified Iraqi province. He administratively reorganized the garrison cities and minted Sasanian-style silver dirhams in his own name. He firmly established Arab power and recommenced conquests in the Caliphate's easternmost province of Khurasan by relocating there 50,000 Arab soldiers and their families from Iraq and dispatching expeditionary forces against Tukharistan, Balkh and Quhistan. Although the mass resettlement improved Iraq's economic and political conditions by siphoning off Arab tribal soldiers from the overcrowded garrisons and creating new opportunities for war spoils, the move had major ramifications for the Caliphate as the descendants of these Khurasani Arab troops formed the army that toppled the Umayyads in 750.

Ziyad died near Kufa in 673, but his sons Ubayd Allah, Abd al-Rahman, Salm, Abbad and Yazid went on to hold posts as governors or deputy governors of Iraq, Khurasan and Sijistan. Ziyad was the subject of early Arabic biographies and is remembered in Arab history as one of the four great genius Arab men of his era and as a highly skilled administrator and orator. His administration in Iraq served as a model for his successors.

== Origins ==
Ziyad was likely born in Ta'if in 622 or 623/24. He was commonly known in the sources as Ziyād ibn Abīhi ("Ziyad son of his father"). He was the illegitimate son of a certain Sumayya, his father likely being Abu Sufyan. The origins of Sumayya are obscure. The 9th-century historians al-Baladhuri and Awana ibn al-Hakam both relate that she had been a slave living in Kashkar, though the former asserts she belonged to a member of the Banu Yashkur, a branch of the Arab tribe of Banu Bakr, and the latter states she belonged to a Persian dehqan (landowning magnate). In the narrative of al-Baladhuri, Sumayya's Yashkuri owner embarked on the Hajj pilgrimage to Mecca seeking to cure his illness and was subsequently treated in Ta'if by al-Harith ibn Kalada, a physician from the Thaqif clan resident in the city; as a reward for his services, Ibn Kalada was gifted Sumayya. In Awana's narrative, Sumayya was given to Ibn Kalada by the Persian dehqan after he treated him. In any case, she was ultimately given to Ubayd, a Greek or Syrian slave belonging to Ibn Kalada's wife. Though Ziyad is said to have alluded to his reported Persian origins in a poem, his family claimed that Sumayya was not a slave, but the daughter of a certain al-A'war from the Zayd Manat clan of the Arab tribe of Banu Tamim.

== Early career in Basra ==
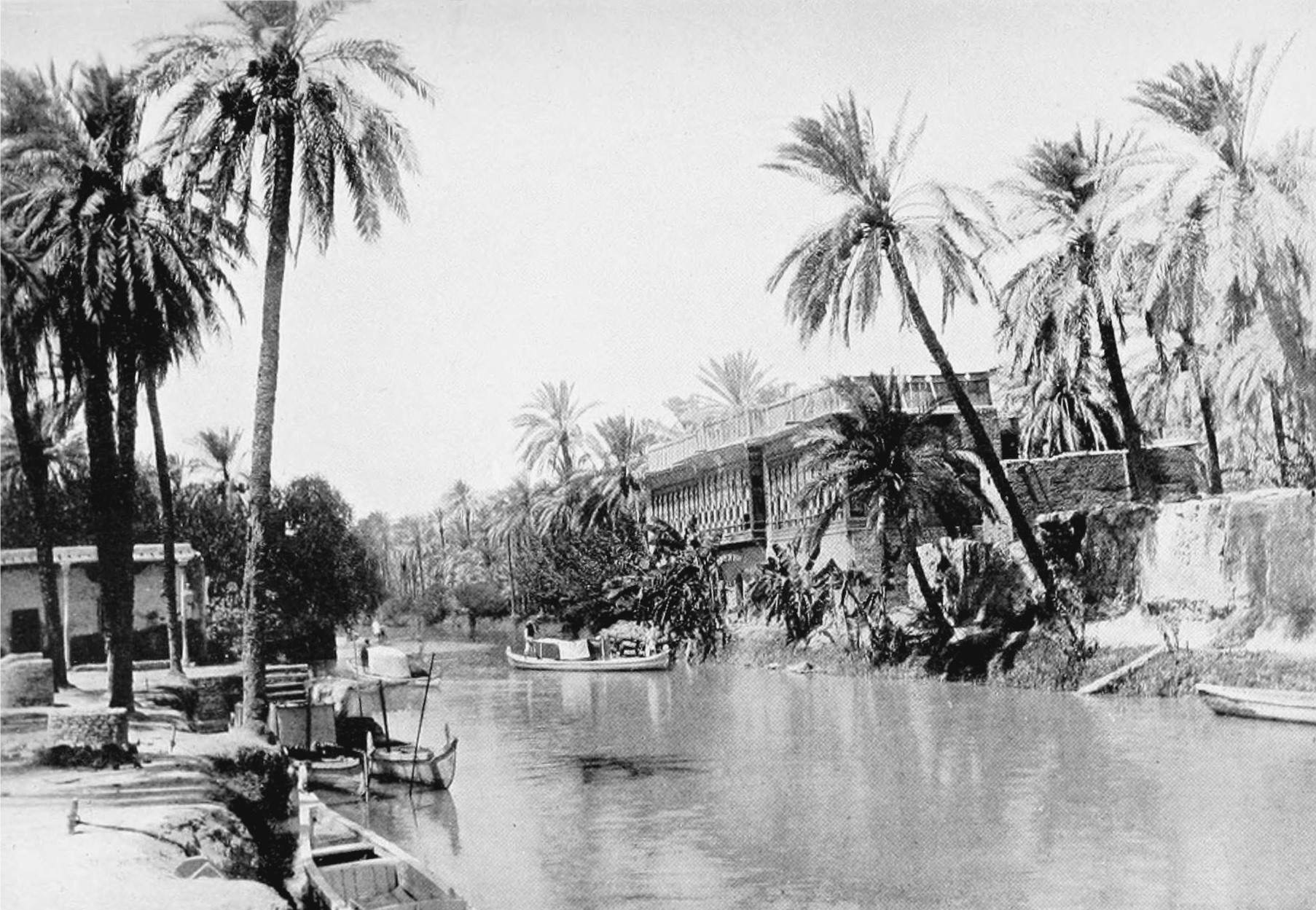
A creek in Basra in the early 20th century. Ziyad began his career in Basra in 636 and served as its governor between 665 and his death in 673

During the reign of Caliph Abu Bakr (r. 632–634), Ziyad embraced Islam, which "opened the world to him", according to historian Julius Wellhausen. He later became one of the first settlers of the Arab garrison town of Basra. Before the city's founding in 638, the Muslim troops fighting on the Iraqi front used as their military camp the ruined Persian village on the site. Ziyad arrived there with the sons of Ibn Kalada, Nafi and Abu Bakra Nufay. The latter's family gained preeminence in the city, having acquired large landholdings there. Abu Bakra's brother-in-law Utba ibn Ghazwan al-Mazini had established the initial camp at Basra in 635 and was the founder and first governor of the city. The administrative skills of Ziyad became apparent from the time of his adolescence and Utba charged him with minor tasks in the Basran dīwān (bureaucracy) during the reign of Caliph Umar (r. 634–644). In 635, Utba tasked him with distributing to the Arab troops the war spoils from the capture of al-Ubulla (Apologos), a town immediately east of Basra. According to the modern historian Isaac Hasson, Ziyad "distinguished himself as an intelligent and open-minded secretary, who was devoted to his master and to public service ... he showed an unusual aptitude for accounting and had an excellent command of epistolary art". His skills and his assignment by Basra's military governor Abu Musa al-Ash'ari as his acting replacement while he was on a military campaign gained the attention of Caliph Umar. He brought Ziyad to Medina, the center of the nascent Muslim state, where he further tested his skills; Ziyad's performance earned him a reward of 1,000 silver dirhams by Umar, which he used to purchase the freedom of his mother or his stepfather Ubayd. Soon after his return to Basra, Ziyad was made Utba's kātib (scribe or secretary).

After Utba's death, Ziyad continued his service as kātib under his successors Abu Musa al-Ash'ari and al-Mughira ibn Shu'ba, a member of the Thaqif who became Ziyad's mentor. When al-Mughira was recalled by Umar to Medina in 638 due to charges of adultery by three accusers, including Abu Bakra Nufay and a certain Shibl ibn Ma'bad al-Bajali, both of whom were Ziyad's maternal half-brothers, Ziyad was also recalled to give his own testimony. His statement was partial toward al-Mughira and as a result, the charges were dismissed and the accusers were flogged. During the reign of Caliph Uthman (r. 644–656), Ziyad served the caliph's appointee to Basra, Abd Allah ibn Amir.

During the outbreak of the First Fitna, the initial Islamic civil war triggered by the assassination of Uthman and the contested accession of his successor Ali (r. 656–661), opposition to Ali crystallized around the Uthmaniyya, partisans demanding vengeance for the slain caliph led by Aisha, Talha, and Zubayr. This opposition culminated in the Battle of the Camel at Basra in 656. During the conflict, Ziyad remained neutral and stayed hidden in the house of Nafi ibn al-Harith, refusing to take part. Following the battle, once his whereabouts were disclosed to Ali, Ziyad met with the caliph, cleared the air regarding his neutral stance, and successfully made his apologies. Ali then appointed Abd Allah ibn Abbas governor of Basra and entrusted Ziyad with collection of the province's kharāj (land tax) and supervision of the treasury. According to Hasson, "Ali's appreciation of Ziyad's talents were so great" that he mandated Ibn Abbas heed Ziyad's counsel. When Ibn Abbas left Basra in 657 to accompany Ali at the Battle of Siffin against the governor of Syria, Mu'awiya ibn Abi Sufyan, he left Ziyad as his acting governor. During this period, he stamped out a pro-Umayyad uprising led by Abd Allah ibn Amr al-Hadrami, who was backed by the Banu Tamim, a major military tribal faction in the city, relying on critical assistance from a rival Basran faction, the Azd.

After Ali returned from Siffin, his appointee to the district of Fars, Sahl ibn Hunayf, was ousted by its inhabitants, after which he dispatched Ziyad. The people of Fars were satisfied with Ziyad's leadership and he was able to collect the district's kharāj. He remained in Fars through the remainder of Ali's rule, which ended with the caliph's assassination in 661 and the foundation of the Umayyad Caliphate under Mu'awiya. Afterward, he remained headquartered in a fortress in the vicinity of Istakhr. Of Ali's appointees, he held out the longest from recognizing Mu'awiya's caliphate. Mu'awiya's agent, Busr ibn Abi Artat, pressured Ziyad by capturing and threatening to kill three of his sons in Basra. Ziyad's half-brother Abu Bakra interceded with Mu'awiya and Ziyad's sons were released. He finally surrendered to Mu'awiya's rule in 662/63 after the intercession of al-Mughira, who Mu'awiya had appointed governor of Kufa, the other main Arab garrison town of Iraq. In the deal reached, the revenues from Fars owed to the caliphal treasury were split between Ziyad and al-Mughira, which Mu'awiya ignored. Ziyad moved to Kufa and maintained intimate ties with al-Mughira and his family.

== Governor of Basra ==
Map of medieval Basra, showing Ziyad's divisions of the city into fifths along Arab tribal factional lines: Abd al-Qays, Tamim, Ahl al-Aliya, Bakr and Azd

Mu'awiya formally recognized Ziyad as a son of his father Abu Sufyan. The motion was initiated when Ziyad sought clarification from the caliph about rumors of Abu Sufyan's biological paternity. According to Wellhausen, Mu'awiya summoned Ziyad to Damascus and recognized him as his paternal half-brother, "so as to bind him in this way absolutely to himself and to his family". The decision was seen as scandalous by the Umayyad ruling family. Mu'awiya's son Yazid and members from other branches of the clan, namely the extended family of Marwan ibn al-Hakam in Medina and Abd Allah ibn Amir, the governor of Basra, protested or threatened action against the decision. Ibn Amir and the Marwanids were silenced as a result of threats of force or bribes. Yazid's relations with Ziyad remained strained and satirical poetic verses about the event were spread by Marwan's brother Abd al-Rahman. Muslim scholars generally viewed the episode as one of Mu'awiya's most disreputable actions.

Realizing that Ziyad "had both the abilities and the all-important local connections to be his right-hand man in Basra", Mu'awiya appointed him governor of the province, according to the historian Hugh N. Kennedy. He entered office in June or July 665, issuing an inaugural carrot-and-stick speech to Basra's restless population. According to Hasson it was "considered a masterpiece of eloquence". Wellhausen describes it as "celebrated" and the one which was called a "[speech] without a preface" because it skipped the traditional introductions praising God and blessing the Islamic prophet Muhammad. The speech is translated as follows:

Ye are putting relationship before religion, ye are excusing and sheltering your criminals, and tearing down the protecting laws sanctified by Islam. Beware of prowling by night; I will kill every one who is found at night in the streets. Beware of the arbitrary summons of relationship; I will cut out the tongue of every one who raises the cry. Whoever pushes anyone into the water, whoever sets fire to another's house, whoever breaks into a house, whoever opens a grave, him will I punish for it. I make every family responsible for those belonging to it. Hatred towards myself I do not punish, but only crime. Many who are terrified at my coming will be glad of my presence, and many who are building their hopes upon it will be undeceived. I rule you with the authority of God and care for your maintenance out of the wealth of God. From you I demand obedience, and ye can demand from me justice. In whatsoever I fall short, three things there are in which I shall not be lacking: at any time I shall be ready to listen to anyone; I shall pay you your pension at the proper time, and I shall not send you to war too far away or keep you in the field overlong. Do not let yourselves be carried away by your hatred and wrath against me; it would go ill with you if ye did. Many heads do I see tottering; let each man see to it that his own remains on his shoulders!

A number of punitive measures along the lines of those cited in his speech were taken by Ziyad at the start of his term and largely gained for him the Basrans' respect. He established unprecedented levels of security in the city, its Iranian dependencies to the east, i.e. Fars and Kerman, and the Arabian Desert to the south. The Kharijites of Basra, many of whom were concerned more with banditry than politics, submitted to his authority. Under Ziyad, Basra began to take shape as a proper Islamic city. His rule saw the crude mud bricks of the city's homes replaced by more durable baked bricks and he built a congregational mosque and residential palace. In the words of the historian Charles Pellat, Ziyad, "to a certain degree, [may] be considered as the artisan of the town's prosperity". His effective rule cemented Mu'awiya's confidence in him. In the same year that Ziyad was appointed to Basra, the province of Bahrayn (eastern Arabia) and its dependency, the Yamama (central Arabia), were attached to Ziyad's governorship.

== Viceroy of Iraq and the east ==
After the death of al-Mughira in 670, Kufa and its dependencies were attached to Ziyad's governorship, making him the practical viceroy over Iraq and the eastern half of the Caliphate. He was the first to serve as the dual governor of Kufa and Basra and divided his residence between the two towns. In the winter he stayed in Basra and left Amr ibn Hurayth as his deputy in Kufa, while he resided in Kufa in the summer, leaving Samura ibn Jundab as his deputy in Basra. His strong grip in Kufa marked a shift from al-Mughira's hands-off approach. A source of disturbance for him in Kufa was the agitation of the Alids, partisans of Caliph Ali, led by Hujr ibn Adi al-Kindi, who disapproved of Umayyad rule and led the first open calls for the caliphate to be held by Ali's progeny. Though al-Mughira tolerated Hujr, Ziyad issued a number of dire warnings to cease his open dissent. He succeeded in turning most of Hujr's supporters among the Kufan troops against him. In 671, he had Hujr and thirteen of his loyalists arrested and sent to Damascus for punishment, where six, including Hujr, were executed in Adra for their refusal to condemn Ali. One of the men, Abd al-Rahman ibn Hassan al-Anazi, who was spared by Mu'awiya later insulted the caliph after refusing his invocation to condemn Ali and was sent back to Ziyad, who had him buried alive as punishment.

To end the chaos in the amṣar (garrisons) of Basra and Kufa, Ziyad administratively reformed the two towns. From the reign of Caliph Umar, their garrisons consisted of soldiers from different tribes who were grouped together for the distribution of military stipends. There were seven such tribal groups in Kufa and Basra and at the head of each group was a chieftain chosen by its members who served as their representative to the government. Gradually, this system had become economically inefficient and politically turbulent. There was no control on Arab immigration into the amṣar, resulting in overpopulation and in turn, increased competition over fewer resources. Ziyad thus resolved to form larger divisions by unifying related clans and personally appointing their leader, which resulted in Kufa's reorganization into quarters and Basra into fifths. This measure enabled easier control of the two towns' inhabitants. Ziyad undertook further reforms in Kufa and Basra, including regularizing the timely payment of stipends, embarking on agricultural development schemes, including canal digging, and minting Sasanian-style dirhams that bore his name as "Ziyad ibn Abi Sufyan".

=== Consolidation of Khurasan ===
Map of early medieval Central Asia with Khurasan, where Ziyad settled 50,000 Arab troops and their families, and Balkh and Tukharistan, where Ziyad's general led expeditions

Ziyad's authority extended to Khurasan and Sijistan, the far eastern regions of the Caliphate which were considered dependencies of the Basra garrison. The Arab conquests of these areas in the 640s and 650s were akin to raids and did not firmly establish the Caliphate's power. Moreover, the political instability of the final years of Uthman's caliphate and the First Muslim Civil War saw local revolts which further weakened Arab authority. In 655, the Sasanian prince Peroz III, backed by the army of Tukharistan, attempted to reassert Persian power. Under previous caliphs, the vast region had been experimentally divided into separate provinces under the leadership of Arab tribal chiefs. Governance was largely left to local princes. Fearing a Persian resurgence, which a fragmentary division of Khurasan could afford, Ziyad centralized the administration of the province in the small Arab garrison at Merv.

To relieve Basra's fiscal pressures, Ziyad recommenced the Muslim conquests in Central Asia. He organized the Arab military presence in Khurasan. In 667, he dispatched an army to the region under his lieutenant general al-Hakam ibn Amr al-Ghifari. The latter conquered lower Tukharistan and Gharchistan and temporarily crossed the Oxus river into Transoxiana, forcing Peroz to withdraw into Tang China. Meanwhile, Ziyad's removal of dead soldiers and input of new recruits to the Iraqi army registers led to numerous tribesmen being taken off the payrolls. He dispatched 50,000 Arab soldiers and their families from Basra and Kufa to permanently settle in the Merv oasis of Khurasan. The resettlement of these troops may have been a means "to defuse possibly dangerous developments" relating to the Arab tribal influx in the two garrison towns, according to the historian Gerald Hawting. As a result, the Merv oasis became home to the largest concentration of Muslims outside of the Fertile Crescent.

Al-Hakam's successor, Ghalib ibn Abd Allah al-Laythi, was less successful in subduing Tukharistan and Ziyad sent another of his lieutenants, Rabi ibn Ziyad al-Harithi, to stamp out the revolts in the conquered areas in 670/71. Rabi proceeded to secure the capitulation of Balkh, whose inhabitants had revolted against Arab rule, in a treaty and then destroyed the army of the Hepthalite princes in Quhistan. In 673, Rabi's son Abd Allah extended Arab rule to the western banks of the Oxus and established tributary agreements with the fortress towns of Amul and Zamm. To solidify the territorial gains and supply the manpower for further conquests Ziyad intended for the Arab troops, initially concentrated in the Merv oasis, to colonize other parts of Khurasan. They were ultimately distributed between five regional garrisons under Ziyad's successors.

== Legacy and assessment ==
Ziyad died in the village of al-Thawiyya near Kufa on 23 August 673. He was buried in a cemetery there that contained the graves of several Qurayshites and left an inheritance of 10,000 silver dirhams. During his governorship of Kufa in 675–678, al-Dahhak ibn Qays al-Fihri visited Ziyad's grave and recited an elegy:

If nobility and Islam ever immortalized a human being,
They would certainly immortalize you.

A year after his death, Mu'awiya appointed Ziyad's son Ubayd Allah as governor of Khurasan and then Basra. Under Mu'awiya's son and successor, Caliph Yazid I (r. 680–683), the governorship of Kufa was also handed to Ubayd Allah. Ziyad's sons Abd al-Rahman and Salm served successively as governors of Khurasan in 678–680 and 680–683/84, and two other sons, Abbad and Yazid, served successively as governors of Sijistan in 673–680/81 and 680/81. The Thaqif, which had maintained close ties with the Umayyads since the pre-Islamic era and played an integral role in the Muslim conquest of Iraq, provided the Umayyad dynasty with a series of viceroys in Iraq, including al-Mughira, Ziyad, Ubayd Allah and al-Hajjaj ibn Yusuf (r. 694–714), and the Muslim traditional sources devote more attention to them than the caliphs on whose behalf they ruled. Along with his mentor al-Mughira, Ziyad and his family were part of what "some must have seen as a Thaqafi mafia" controlling Iraq and the east, according to Kennedy.

Among "the most gifted governors of the Umayyad era", Ziyad "had a good understanding of his task as governor, and had a great influence on his successors concerning the conception of the duties of rulers", according to Hasson. According to Kennedy, Ziyad's settlement of Iraqi Arab troops in Khurasan had "extremely important consequences for Islamic history" as the descendants of those settlers, who were known as ahl Khurāsān, ultimately destroyed the Umayyad Caliphate as part of the Abbasid army in 750. The execution of Hujr and his six partisans, all of whom had been prominent men in their own right, also led to deep-seated resentment among their Kufan kinsmen. The incident would serve as a harbinger for future pro-Alid risings. The death of Hujr represented the first political execution in Islamic history, and he and his companions are viewed as martyrs by Shia Muslims. Ziyad was alleged to have ordered cruel acts against some Alid partisans, including crucifixions.

Interest in Ziyad's biography emerged early on among the traditional Muslim historians, with works written about him by Abu Mikhnaf (d. 774), Hisham ibn al-Kalbi (d. 819) and Abd al-Aziz ibn Yahya al-Jaludi (d. 943). He is considered a highly skilled orator among Arabs, with his inaugural speech and fragments of other speeches and sayings cited in Islamic literature and Arabic rhetoric, polemics and histories. He is counted alongside Mu'awiya, al-Mughira and Amr ibn al-As, the conqueror and governor of Egypt, as one of the four duhāt (i.e. "shrewds") among the Arab statesmen of his era. According to the medieval Syrian historian Ibn Asakir (d. 1176), Ziyad had expert knowledge of the Qur'an, its tenets and Islamic jurisprudence. A medieval Basran historian, Muhammad ibn Imran al-Abdi, related that Ziyad respected and enjoyed listening to the hadiths about Umar and proclaimed about them: "This is the truth we hear! This is the sunna!" Ziyad is credited by a number of sources for transmitting sayings by the Islamic prophet Muhammad through Umar as the original transmitter. In 777 the Abbasid authorities stripped Ziyad's descendants of their status as official members of the Quraysh (the tribe to which the Umayyads and Abbasids belonged) in the dīwān rolls, which entitled them to relatively high pensions, and declared them part of Thaqif, whose members were paid less. At some point afterward, they were reinstated as Quraysh as a result of bribing government officials.

== Family ==
Ziyad had numerous wives and ummahat awlad (slave women who bore children; sing. umm walad). He had twenty sons and twenty-three daughters, most of whom were the children of ummahat awlad. From his first wife, Mu'adha bint Sakhr of the Banu Uqayl tribe, Ziyad had four sons, including Muhammad and Abd al-Rahman, who respectively married daughters of Caliph Mu'awiya I and the latter's brother Utba. His other Arab wives were Lubaba bint Awf al-Harashiyya, the daughter of a Basran noble, whose brother Zurara was a prominent Muslim jurist and one-time qadi (Islamic head judge) of Basra on Ziyad's behalf; an unnamed daughter of al-Qa'qa' ibn Ma'bad ibn Zurara, a chieftain of the Darim clan of the Banu Tamim tribe who was credited for leading his tribe's first delegation to the Islamic prophet Muhammad; an unnamed daughter of Muhajir ibn Hakim ibn Taliq ibn Sufyan, a fifth-generation descendant of the Umayyad clan's progenitor Umayya ibn Abd Shams; and an unnamed woman from the Khuza'a tribe. Ziyad was also married for a time to a Sasanian Persian princess, Marjana (or Manjana), who mothered his son Ubayd Allah; she later remarried a Persian commander of Ziyad called Shiruyah al-Uswari.

Ziyad's daughter Ramla was a wife of the Umayyad prince Umayya, son of Ziyad's deputy governor of Fars province or its Ardashir-Khurrah district and later the deputy governor of Kufa, Abdallah ibn Khalid ibn Asid, who led Ziyad's funeral prayers and served as Kufa's governor until 675. Ziyad had successively appointed Umayya as the deputy governor of Khuzistan and al-Ubulla. Ziyad's daughter Sakhra was married to a noble of the Qurayshite Makhzum clan, Ubaydallah ibn Abd al-Rahman ibn al-Harith, a great-grandson of Hisham ibn al-Mughira.

== Bibliography ==
- Baloch, Nabi Bakhsh Khan (July 1946). "The Probable Date of the First Arab Expeditions to India". Islamic Culture. 20 (3): 250–266.
- Bosworth, C. E. (1968). Sīstān under the Arabs: From the Islamic Conquest to the Rise of the Ṣaffārids (30–250, 651–864). Rome: Istituto italiano per il Medio ed Estremo Oriente. ISBN 9788863231243. OCLC 956878036.
- Bosworth, C. E. (1995). "Salm b. Ziyād b. Abīhi". In Bosworth, C. E.; van Donzel, E.; Heinrichs, W. P. & Lecomte, G. (eds.). The Encyclopaedia of Islam, Second Edition. Volume VIII: Ned–Sam. Leiden: E. J. Brill. p. 997. ISBN 978-90-04-09834-3.
- Boullata, Issa J. (2011). The Unique Necklace: Al-'Iqd Al-Farid, Volume 3. Reading: Garnet Publishing. ISBN 978-1-85964-240-5.
- Donner, Fred M. (1981). The Early Islamic Conquests. Princeton: Princeton University Press.
- Gibb, H. A. R. (1923). The Arab Conquests in Central Asia. London: The Royal Asiatic Society.
- Fariq, K. A. (1966). Ziyād b. Abīh. London: Asia Publishing House. OCLC 581630755.
- Hakim, Avraham (January 2008). "ʿUmar b. al-Ḫaṭṭāb: L'autorité religieuse et morale". Arabica (in French). 55 (1). Brill: 1–34. doi:10.1163/157005808X289296. JSTOR 25162264.
- Hasson, I. (2002). "Ziyād b. Abīhi". In Bearman, P. J.; Bianquis, Th.; Bosworth, C. E.; van Donzel, E. & Heinrichs, W. P. (eds.). The Encyclopaedia of Islam, Second Edition. Volume XI: W–Z. Leiden: E. J. Brill. pp. 519–522. ISBN 978-90-04-12756-2.
- Hawting, Gerald R. (2000). The First Dynasty of Islam: The Umayyad Caliphate AD 661–750 (Second ed.). London and New York: Routledge. ISBN 0-415-24072-7.
- Hinds, M. (1993). "Muʿāwiya I b. Abī Sufyān". In Bosworth, C. E.; van Donzel, E.; Heinrichs, W. P. & Pellat, Ch. (eds.). The Encyclopaedia of Islam, Second Edition. Volume VII: Mif–Naz. Leiden: E. J. Brill. pp. 263–268. ISBN 978-90-04-09419-2.
- Kennedy, Hugh (2004) [1986]. The Prophet and the Age of the Caliphates: The Islamic Near East from the 6th to the 11th Century (Second ed.). Harlow: Longman. ISBN 978-0-582-40525-7.
- Howard, I. K. A., ed. (1990). The History of al-Ṭabarī, Volume XIX: The Caliphate of Yazīd ibn Muʿāwiyah, A.D. 680–683/A.H. 60–64. SUNY Series in Near Eastern Studies. Albany, New York: State University of New York Press. ISBN 978-0-7914-0040-1.
- Lynch, Ryan J. (2018). "Ziyad b. Abi Sufyan (Ziyad b. Abihi)". In Nicholson, Oliver (ed.). The Oxford Dictionary of Late Antiquity. Oxford: Oxford University Press. ISBN 978-0-19-866277-8.
- Madelung, Wilferd (1997). The Succession to Muhammad: A Study of the Early Caliphate. Cambridge: Cambridge University Press. ISBN 0-521-56181-7.
- Morony, Michael (1976). "The Effects of the Muslim Conquest on the Persian Population of Iraq". Iran. 14: 41–59. doi:10.2307/4300543. JSTOR 4300543.
- Morony, Michael G., ed. (1987). The History of al-Ṭabarī, Volume XVIII: Between Civil Wars: The Caliphate of Muʿāwiyah, 661–680 A.D./A.H. 40–60. SUNY Series in Near Eastern Studies. Albany, New York: State University of New York Press. ISBN 978-0-87395-933-9.
- Pellat, Ch. (1960). "Al-Baṣra — Baṣra until the Mongol conquest (656/1258)". In Gibb, H. A. R.; Kramers, J. H.; Lévi-Provençal, E.; Schacht, J.; Lewis, B. & Pellat, Ch. (eds.). The Encyclopaedia of Islam, Second Edition. Volume I: A–B. Leiden: E. J. Brill. pp. 1085–1086. OCLC 495469456.
- Robinson, C. F. (2000). "ʿUbayd Allāh b. Ziyād". In Bearman, P. J.; Bianquis, Th.; Bosworth, C. E.; van Donzel, E. & Heinrichs, W. P. (eds.). The Encyclopaedia of Islam, Second Edition. Volume X: T–U. Leiden: E. J. Brill. pp. 763–764. ISBN 978-90-04-11211-7.
- Shaban, M. A. (1979). The 'Abbāsid Revolution. Cambridge: Cambridge University Press. ISBN 0-521-29534-3.
- Tritton, A. S. (1954). "Notes and Communications". Bulletin of the School of Oriental and African Studies. 16 (1): 170–172. doi:10.1017/S0041977X0014354X. JSTOR 608915. S2CID 154927468.
- Wellhausen, Julius (1927). The Arab Kingdom and Its Fall. Translated by Margaret Graham Weir. Calcutta: University of Calcutta.
- Zakeri, Mohsen (1995). Sasanid Soldiers in Early Muslim Society: The Origins of 'Ayyārān and Futuwwa. Wiesbaden: Harassowitz Verlag. ISBN 3-447-03652-4.
- Zetterstéen, K. V. (1960). "ʿAbbād b. Ziyād". In Gibb, H. A. R.; Kramers, J. H.; Lévi-Provençal, E.; Schacht, J.; Lewis, B. & Pellat, Ch. (eds.). The Encyclopaedia of Islam, Second Edition. Volume I: A–B. Leiden: E. J. Brill. p. 5. OCLC 495469456.
- Brockett, Adrian, ed. (1997). The History of al-Ṭabarī, Volume XVI: The Community Divided: The Caliphate of ʿAlī I, A.D. 656–657/A.H. 35–36. SUNY Series in Near Eastern Studies. Albany, New York: State University of New York Press. ISBN 978-0-7914-2391-2.
- Crone, Patricia (2005). Medieval Islamic Political Thought. Edinburgh University Press. ISBN 978-0-7486-4650-0.

Preceded by Abd Allah ibn Amir	Governor of Basra; 665–670	Succeeded by Office merged into governorship of Iraq
Preceded by Office established	Governor of Iraq; 670–673	Succeeded by Samura ibn Jundab (Basra); Abdallah ibn Khalid ibn Asid (Kufa)
