= Ubayd Allah ibn Ziyad =

Umayyad general and governor (died 686)

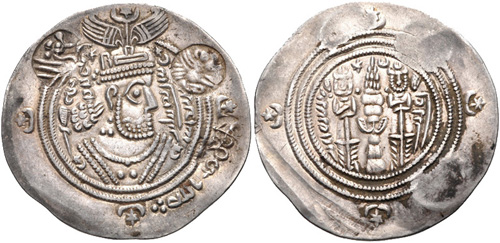
- Silver dirham following Sassanid motives, struck in the name of Ubayd Allah

Governor of Khurasan
- In office 673–675
- Preceded by: Ziyad ibn Abihi
- Succeeded by: Aslam ibn Zur'a al-Kilabi

Governor of Basra
- In office 674/75–684
- Preceded by: Abd Allah ibn Amr ibn Ghaylan
- Succeeded by: Abd Allah ibn al-Harith al-Hashimi

Governor of Kufa
- In office 679/680–683/684
- Preceded by: Nu'man ibn Bashir
- Succeeded by: Amir ibn Mas'ud al-Jumahi

Personal details
- Died: 6 August 686 Near the Khazir River, Iraq
- Parent(s): Ziyad ibn Abihi (father); Marjana al-Farsiyya (mother)
- Relatives: Abbad, Salm, Yazid, Abd al-Rahman (siblings)

Military service
- Allegiance: Umayyad Caliphate
- Branch/service: Umayyad army
- Years of service: 674–686
- Battles/wars: Early Muslim conquests; Muslim conquest of Transoxiana; Second Fitna; Battle of Karbala; Battle of Marj Rahit; Battle of Ayn al-Warda; Battle of Khazir †

Ubayd Allah ibn Ziyad (Arabic: عُبَيْدِ اللَّهِ بْنِ زِيَادٍ, romanized: ʿUbayd Allāh ibn Ziyād) was the Umayyad governor of Basra, Kufa and Khurasan during the reigns of caliphs Mu'awiya I (r. 661–680) and Yazid I (r. 680–683), and the leading general of the Umayyad army under caliphs Marwan I (r. 684–685) and Abd al-Malik (r. 685–705).

He virtually inherited the governorships from his father Ziyad ibn Abihi after the latter's death in 673. During Ubayd Allah's governorship, he suppressed Kharijite and Alid revolts. In the ensuing Battle of Karbala in 680, Husayn ibn Ali and his small retinue were slain by Ubayd Allah's troops, shocking many in the Muslim community. Ubayd Allah is primarily remembered for his role in the killings of members of Ali's family and he has become infamous in Muslim tradition. Ubayd Allah was ultimately evicted from Iraq by the Arab tribal nobility amid the revolt of Abd Allah ibn al-Zubayr.

He made it to Syria where he persuaded Marwan I to seek the caliphate and helped galvanize support for the flailing Umayyads. Afterward, he fought at the Battle of Marj Rahit in 684 against pro-Zubayrid tribes and helped reconstitute the Umayyad army. With this army he struggled against rebel Qaysi tribes in the Jazira before advancing against the Alids and Zubayrids of Iraq. However, he was slain and his forces routed at the Battle of Khazir by Ibrahim ibn al-Ashtar, commander of the pro-Alid forces of Mukhtar al-Thaqafi.

== Origins ==
Ubayd Allah was the son of Ziyad ibn Abihi whose tribal origins were obscure; while his mother was a Persian concubine named Murjanah. Ziyad served as the Umayyad governor of Iraq and the lands east of that province, collectively known as Khurasan, during the reign of Caliph Mu'awiya I (r. 661–680).

== Governor of Iraq and Khurasan ==
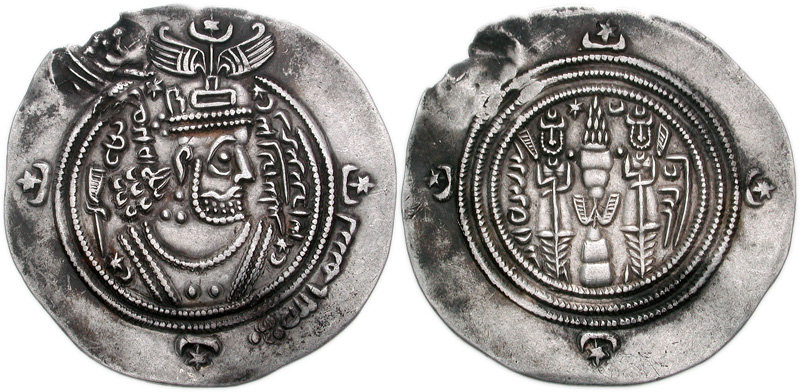
Umayyad Caliphate coin imitating Sasanid Empire ruler Khosrau II. Coin of the time of Mu'awiya I ibn Abi Sufyan. BCRA (Basra) mint; "Ubayd Allah ibn Ziyad, governor". Dated AH 56 = 675/6 CE. Sasanian style bust imitating Khosrau II right; bismillah and three pellets in margin; c/m: winged creature right / Fire altar with ribbons and attendants; star and crescent flanking flames; date to left, mint name to right.

Ubayd Allah's father prepared him to succeed him as governor, and indeed, after Ziyad's death in 672/673, Ubayd Allah became governor of Khurasan. A year or two later, he was also appointed to the governorship of Basra. According to historian Hugh N. Kennedy, Ubayd Allah was "more hasty and given to the use of force than his father, but a man whose devotion to the Umayyad cause could not have been doubted".

In 674 he crossed the Amu Darya and defeated the forces of the ruler of Bukhara in the first known invasion of the city by Muslim Arabs. After he was appointed governor of Basra soon afterwards, he also took several thousand Bukharan captives with him as slaves. Out of those slaves the Bukhariya military unit was formed. From at least 674 and 675, Ubayd Allah had coins struck in his name in Khurasan and Basra, respectively. They were based on Sasanian coinage and written in Pahlavi script. The mints were located in Basra, Darabjird, Maysan, Narmashir, Jayy and, to a lesser extent, Kufa. The latter was attached to Ubayd Allah's governorship in 679/680, giving him full control of Iraq.

=== Suppression of the pro-Alid groups ===
Mu'awiya died in 680 and was succeeded by his son Yazid I. Mu'awiya's designation of his son was an unprecedented act and shocked many in the Muslim community, particularly the Arab nobility of Kufa. They had long been sympathetic to Caliph Ali, Mu'awiya's former rival, and his family. One of Ali's sons, Husayn dispatched his cousin Muslim ibn Aqil to Kufa to set the stage for Husayn's accession to the caliphate. Ibn Aqil garnered significant support and was hosted by a prominent pro-Alid nobleman. Ubayd Allah became aware of Ibn Aqil's activities, prompting the latter to launch a premature assault against the governor. Ubayd Allah was holed up in his palace, but thirty men from his shurta (security forces) fended off Ibn Aqil's partisans, while he persuaded many Kufan noblemen to back him against Ibn Aqil, who was abandoned by his supporters and slain on 10 September 680.

Husayn had already been en route to Kufa from Medina when he received news of Ibn Aqil's execution. Ubayd Allah was prepared for Husayn's arrival and sent troops to intercept him. They prevented Husayn and his small retinue from reaching the watered areas of the province. The two sides negotiated for weeks, but Ubayd Allah refused Husayn entry into Kufa or return to Arabia while Husayn refused to recognize Yazid's caliphate. In the end, a short battle was fought at Karbala on 10 October 680, in which Husayn and nearly all of his partisans were slain. Husayn had never received the expected backing of his Kufan sympathizers, but the latter's resentment festered as a result of his death. The slaying of Husayn, a grandson of the Islamic prophet Muhammad, perturbed many Muslims.

== Role in Umayyad succession of 684 ==
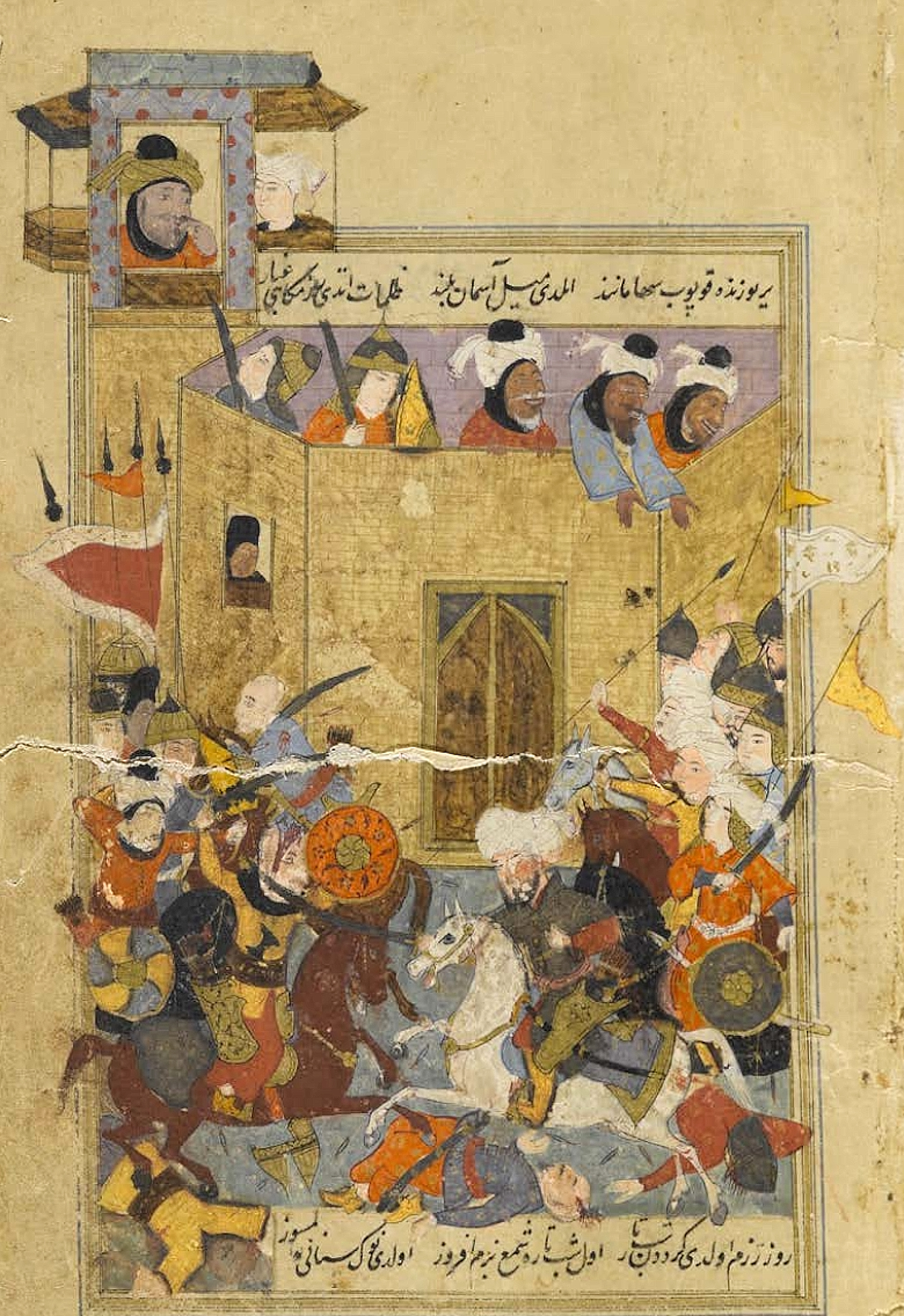
Battle between the ʿAlid forces of Muslim b. Aqil and Umayyad forces of Ubayd Allah ibn Ziyad. Ḥadīḳatü’s Süʾedā, Brooklyn Museum of Art, Brooklyn, 70.143, fol. 324a

The death of Yazid in 683 led to a major leadership crisis in the caliphate, and "the power of his house seemed to collapse everywhere", in the words of Orientalist Julius Wellhausen. Ubayd Allah initially neglected to support Yazid's son and designated successor, Mu'awiya II and secured oaths of allegiance to himself from the Basran Arab nobility. In a speech addressed to them, he emphasized his connection to Basra and promised to maintain the wealth of the city's inhabitants. Nonetheless, the Basrans turned against him, forcing him to abandon his palace. He was replaced by Abd Allah ibn al-Harith, a member of the Banu Hashim. Ubayd Allah took refuge with the Azdi chieftain Mas'ud ibn Amr in late 683 or early 684. He plotted to restore his governorship by encouraging Mas'ud to form an alliance of the Yamani and Rabi'a tribes against his opponents from the Banu Tamim and Ibn al-Harith. Mas'ud took to the pulpit of Basra's mosque to stir up the revolt, but Tamimi tribesmen under Ibn al-Harith and their asawira allies under Mah-Afridhun, stormed the building and killed Mas'ud. After Mas'ud's death, Ubayd Allah fled the city practically alone in March 684, taking the Syrian desert route to Hawran or Palmyra. In his rush to escape, he left his wife and family behind.

When Ubayd Allah arrived in Syria, he found it in political disarray; Caliph Mu'awiya II had died weeks into his rule and a power vacuum ensued with many Syrian noblemen, particularly from the Qaysi tribes, switching allegiance to the rival, Mecca-based caliphate of Abd Allah ibn al-Zubayr. The latter had expelled the Umayyads from the Hejaz and among the exiles to Syria was Marwan ibn al-Hakam, an Umayyad elder. Ubayd Allah persuaded Marwan, who was preparing to recognize Ibn al-Zubayr's sovereignty, to enter his candidacy as Mu'awiya II's successor. The Umayyads' principal Syrian allies, the Banu Kalb, had sought to maintain Umayyad rule and nominated Mu'awiya II's half-brother Khalid as caliph. However, the other pro-Umayyad Syrian tribes viewed Khalid as too young and inexperienced, and rallied around Marwan, who was ultimately chosen as caliph.

== Military campaigns in Syria and Jazira ==
Ubayd Allah fought for Marwan and his tribal allies against the Qaysi tribes led by al-Dahhak ibn Qays al-Fihri, the governor of Damascus, at the Battle of Marj Rahit in August 684. The Qays were routed and al-Dahhak killed. Ubayd Allah was put in command of Marwan's army which, during Marj Rahit, consisted of 6,000 men from a handful of loyalist tribes. According to Kennedy, Ubayd Allah "clearly intended to rebuild the Syrian army which had served Mu'awiya and Yazid I so well". In the aftermath of Marj Rahit, Ubayd Allah oversaw campaigns against rebel Qaysi tribes for Marwan and his son and successor Abd al-Malik (r. 685–705) in the Jazira. However, Marwan's forces were too little to assert Umayyad rule throughout the caliphate. Thus, Ubayd Allah expanded recruitment to include various Qaysi tribes. He placed Husayn ibn Numayr al-Sakuni of Kindah as his second-in-command, and Shurahbil ibn Dhi'l Kala' of Himyar, Adham ibn Muhriz of Bahila, Rabi'a ibn al-Mukhariq of Banu Ghani and Jabala ibn Abd Allah of Khath'am as deputy commanders. Other than Husayn ibn Numayr, all of the commanders were either Qaysi or had earlier supported al-Dahhak against Marwan.

In January 685, as Ubayd Allah was in Manbij preparing for the Umayyad reconquest of Iraq, Husayn ibn Numayr defeated the pro-Alid Penitents at the Battle of Ayn al-Warda. Ubayd Allah had been promised by Marwan the governorship over all of the lands he could conquer from the Alids and Ibn al-Zubayr, and he may have been sanctioned to plunder Kufa. For the following year, Ubayd Allah was bogged down in battles with the Qaysi tribes of Jazira led by Zufar ibn al-Harith al-Kilabi. By 686, Ubayd Allah's army numbered some 60,000 troops.

By the time Ubayd Allah's army approached Mosul toward Iraq, the Zubayrids under Mus'ab ibn al-Zubayr had established themselves in Basra while Mukhtar al-Thaqafi took control of Kufa in the name of the Alid Muhammad ibn al-Hanafiyya. Mukhtar dispatched Ibrahim ibn al-Ashtar and an army composed largely of non-Arab freedmen to confront Ubayd Allah. The latter fended off the first wave of Mukhtar's troops, and proceeded to face off Ibn al-Ashtar at the Khazir River. In the ensuing Battle of Khazir, the Umayyad army was routed and Ubayd Allah was slain by Ibn al-Ashtar. His lieutenants Husayn, Shurahbil and al-Rabi'a were also killed. With Ubayd Allah's death, Caliph Abd al-Malik halted further advances against Iraq until 691.

== Bibliography ==
- Brock, Sebastian P. (1987). "North Mesopotamia in the late Seventh Century: Book XV of John Bar Penkāyē's Rīš Mellē". Jerusalem Studies in Arabic and Islam. 9: 51–75. ISSN 0334-4118.
- Crone, Patricia (1980). Slaves on Horses: The Evolution of the Islamic Polity (1980 ed.). Cambridge: Cambridge University Press. p. 93. ISBN 978-0521229616.
- Donner, Fred M. (2010). Muhammad and the Believers. Cambridge: The Belknap Press of Harvard University Press. ISBN 978-0-674-05097-6.
- Gibb, H. A. R. (2013) [1923]. The Arab Conquests in Central Asia. Read Books. ISBN 1-4067-5239-8.
- Gibb, H. A. R. (2007). The Arab Conquests in Central Asia. Read Books. ISBN 978-1-4067-5239-7. OCLC 474026895.
- Hasson, I. (2002). "Ziyād b. Abiḥī". The Encyclopaedia of Islam, Second Edition (12 vols.). Leiden: E. J. Brill. pp. 519–522.
- Kennedy, Hugh (2001). The Armies of the Caliphs: Military and Society in the Early Islamic State. London and New York: Routledge. ISBN 0-415-25093-5.
- Kennedy, Hugh (2004) [1986]. The Prophet and the Age of the Caliphates: The Islamic Near East from the 6th to the 11th Century (Second ed.). Harlow: Longman. ISBN 978-0-582-40525-7.
- Madelung, Wifred (October 1981). "ʿAbd Allāh b. al-Zubayr and the Mahdi". Journal of Near Eastern Studies. 4 (1): 291–305. ISSN 0022-2968. JSTOR 544603.
- Robinson, C. F. (2000). "ʿUbayd Allāh b. Ziyād". In Bearman, P. J.; Bianquis, Th.; Bosworth, C. E.; van Donzel, E. & Heinrichs, W. P. (eds.). The Encyclopaedia of Islam, Second Edition. Volume X: T–U. Leiden: E. J. Brill. pp. 763–764. ISBN 978-90-04-11211-7.
- Wellhausen, Julius (1927). The Arab Kingdom and Its Fall. Translated by Margaret Graham Weir. Calcutta: University of Calcutta.
- Pipes, Daniel (1978). Tekin, Şinasi; İz, Fahir (eds.). "Turks in Early Muslim Service" (PDF). Journal of Turkish Studies. 2: 86.

Preceded by Ziyad ibn Abihi	Governor of Khurasan; 673–676	Succeeded by Aslam ibn Zur'a al-Kilabi
Preceded by Abd Allah ibn Amr ibn Ghaylan	Governor of Basra; 674/675–684	Succeeded by Abd Allah ibn al-Harith al-Hashimi
Preceded by Nu'man ibn Bashir al-Ansari	Governor of Kufa; 679/680–683/684	Succeeded by 'Amir ibn Mas'ud al-Jumahi
