= Salih ibn Abd al-Rahman =

Umayyad bureaucrat (died 721–724)

Abū al-Walīd Ṣāliḥ ibn ʿAbd al-Rahmān al-Sijistānī (Arabic: صالح بن عبدالرحمن) (died 721–724) was a leading bureaucrat in the central dīwān (tax bureau) of Iraq under the Umayyad governor al-Hajjaj ibn Yusuf (694–714) and then fiscal governor of the province under Caliph Sulayman ibn Abd al-Malik (r. 715–717). In 697, upon al-Hajjaj's order, he carried out the conversion of the Persian-language Iraqi dīwān into Arabic.

== Origins ==
The year of Salih's birth is not known. He was one of at least two sons of a mawlā (Muslim convert or freedman) originally from Sijistan called Abd al-Rahman. The latter had been taken captive in 650/51 by the troops of Rabi ibn Ziyad al-Harithi, an Arab commander dispatched to Sijistan by the governor of Basra, Abd Allah ibn Amir, who at the time was leading an expedition in Khurasan. Together with his wife, Abd al-Rahman, whose original name is not known, was captured in the village of Nashrudh during one of Rabi's raids in the vicinity of Zaranj. They were brought to the Arab garrison town and provincial center of Basra, where both were purchased by a certain Abla, a woman of the Banu Tamim, and then freed by her upon their conversion to Islam.

== Career ==
=== Administration of Iraq under al-Hajjaj ===
During the governorship of al-Hajjaj ibn Yusuf over Iraq, Salih entered the dīwān (bureaucratic administration) of Basra under the mentorship of the Persian Zoroastrian administrator Zadhanfarrukh. At the time, the language of bureaucracy in Iraq and the eastern half of the Caliphate was Persian. Unlike Zadhanfarrukh, Salih was fluent in Arabic as well as Persian, due to his Muslim upbringing in Basra. This knowledge combined with his demonstrable competence and frugality caught the attention of al-Hajjaj. When the latter moved to convert the Persian tax records of Iraq's central dīwān to Arabic in 697, he entrusted Salih with the task.

The local and provincial dīwāns in Iraq and the eastern provinces remained Persian for many years after the change, and Salih was charged with training his bureaucrats to adopt the new Arabic system. His efforts were met with resistance by Zadhanfarrukh, the latter's son Mardanshah and the veteran Persian bureaucrats. Mardanshah attempted to convince him of the inability of Arabic to translate Persian fractions (Arabic did not have forms for fractions below tenths), which Salih solved by using tenths and half-tenths. Mardanshah also attempted to bribe Salih with 100,000 silver dirhams to persuade al-Hajjaj of his inability to effect the language changes, but Salih refused. Nonetheless, he did not inform al-Hajjaj of his colleagues' attempts to void his assignment, which would have led to their dismissals and possible executions. The next generation of Iraqi tax administrators were the pupils of Salih and held him in high esteem. The kātib (scribe) of Caliph Marwan II, Abd al-Hamid ibn Yahya, noted this, saying: "What a man Salih was! How great his favor to the scribes".

Despite his integral role in the administration, Salih did not hold an official post under al-Hajjaj; the caliphs Abd al-Malik (r. 685–705) and al-Walid I (r. 705–715) combined the military and fiscal responsibilities of Iraq and the east into the singular authority of al-Hajjaj. Salih was referred to as the ṣāḥib dawāwīn, akin to the superintendent of Iraq's central tax bureaux in Wasit. When, in 702, al-Hajjaj built Wasit as the new capital of Iraq and the garrison of his elite Syrian troops, the costs of construction totaled 43,000,000 dirhams, a sum far more expensive than the governor had anticipated. To rectify the budget, Salih attributed about 80% of the cost to war expenses, and the remainder to construction.

Salih was suspected of harboring sympathies for proto-Shu'ubiyya Kharijites. To test his loyalty, al-Hajjaj, at the prodding of his protege Yazid ibn Abi Muslim, commanded Salih to execute the captive Kharijite leader Jawwab al-Dabbi. Fearing for the welfare of his daughters should he refuse, Salih carried out the killing.

=== Fiscal governor of Iraq ===
Shortly after his accession, Caliph Sulayman ibn Abd al-Malik (r. 715–717) removed the deputy governors and commanders appointed or associated with al-Hajjaj, including the latter's successor in Iraq, Yazid ibn Abi Muslim. In his place, he appointed Yazid ibn al-Muhallab as governor of Iraq for its military and religious affairs and Salih as fiscal governor of the province. Salih's appointment was recommended by Ibn al-Muhallab, who was disinterested in responsibility over tax collection. Nonetheless, as he was directly appointed by Sulayman, he answered to the caliph and was a near equal in rank to Ibn al-Muhallab. Though he generally did not restrict funding for the army or provisions, Salih frequently stopped attempts by Ibn al-Muhallab to squander treasury funds for personal use. Reflecting on his own role in Salih's appointment, Ibn al-Muhallab expressed his frustration: "This is what I have done to myself".

Sulayman charged Salih with the arrest, torture and execution of several member of the Abu Aqil clan to which al-Hajjaj belonged. Among the prisoners in Wasit, the headquarters of Salih, was the conqueror and governor of Sind, Muhammad ibn Qasim, and his brother al-Hajjaj ibn Qasim, the latter of whom had killed Salih's brother Adam for his active role with Kharijite rebels. Salih followed the order and charged Ibn al-Muhallab's brother, Abd al-Malik, with supervising the torture.

Among Salih's achievements was the construction of a governor's house in Basra. Though Wasit was established as Iraq's capital, Basra and Kufa still served as subgovernorships and Salih sought to replace the ruined clay palace built by a previous governor, Ubayd Allah ibn Ziyad. After gaining Sulayman's approval for the construction, Salih had a taller, less expensive palace built, the first in the city to consist of baked brick and gypsum.

=== Later life and death ===
Salih's fortunes changed abruptly with the death of Sulayman and the accession Umar II (r. 717–720) in September 717. Salih was dismissed by the caliph and likely retired from the public sector. At some point, he relocated the caliph's court in Syria during the reign of Caliph Yazid II (r. 720–724), who was deferential to Salih. Shortly after the accession of Yazid II, Ibn al-Muhallab raised a mass revolt against the Umayyads in Iraq, which was stamped out by the governor Umar ibn Hubayra al-Fazari and the caliph's brother Maslama ibn Abd al-Malik. Afterward, Ibn Hubayra sought to snuff out Ibn al-Muhallab's associates in the province and override the system of tax management established by Salih. He remained wary of the latter's influence. Seeking to find a cause to have him arrested, Ibn Hubayra charged a bureaucrat from Anbar with scouring the budget records to find any violations that Salih may have committed. They were not successful, but pinned on him a major discrepancy of 600,000 dirhams by Ibn al-Muhallab. Ibn Hubayra submitted the complaint to the caliph, who consequently arrested and sent Salih for prosecution in Iraq. There, Ibn Hubayra personally tortured him to death.

In the assessment of the historian Martin Sprengling, "Salih ibn Abdalrahman remains a sad, lonely figure, outstanding, of most extraordinary ability, rising for his moment to heights far above the average, then melting completely out of sight". His memory was preserved by his pupils and successors in Iraq's dīwān. Among them were Ibn al-Muqaffa', who wrote of him fondly, the mawlā Abd al-Hamid ibn Yahya who considered Salih the greatest benefactor of the Umayyad-era scribes, and Qahdam, the Persian progenitor of several generations of scribes who were active during the early Abbasid Caliphate.

== See also ==
- Sulayman ibn Sa'd al-Khushani, administrator who carried out the transition of Syria language of government from Greek to Arabic in 700.

== Bibliography ==
- Powers, David S., ed. (1989). The History of al-Ṭabarī, Volume XXIV: The Empire in Transition: The Caliphates of Sulaymān, ʿUmar, and Yazīd, A.D. 715–724/A.H. 96–105. SUNY Series in Near Eastern Studies. Albany, New York: State University of New York Press. ISBN 978-0-7914-0072-2.
- Sprengling, Martin (April 1939). "From Persian to Arabic". The American Journal of Semitic Languages and Literatures. 56 (2). The University of Chicago Press: 175–224. doi:10.1086/370538. JSTOR 528934. S2CID 170486943.
