= Cosmas the Monk =

7th-century Italian clergyman

Cosmas the Monk was a 7th-century clergyman who features in Chalcedonian traditions. Any knowledge of Cosmas comes from the notably unreliable 10th-century hagiography of John of Damascus.

He was a scholar who became the teacher to John of Damascus and his foster brother. To the Chalcedonians he is known as Cosmas the Sicilian (fl. late 7th century). a slave of the Saracens rescued from execution in 664AD in Sicily by a judge from Damascus called Ibn Mansur, the Father of John of Damascus who employed him as the tutor of John and his orphan foster brother Cosmas of Maiuma who became the Poet of the Holy City. Apparently, John's father met Cosmas, a scholar who knew Greek, on the shores of Sicily when the latter was about to be executed. He was crying loudly and when asked why a monk would cry in the face of death, answered that he was bemoaning the loss of the knowledge he had gathered, "for he knew nearly everything under the sun." In response, John's father (a judge) had him released and appointed him as tutor for his son.
