= Sulayman ibn Sa'd al-Khushani =

Late 7th/early 8th century Umayyad Caliphate administrator

Abū Thābit Sulaymān ibn Saʿd al-Khūshani (Arabic: سليمان بن سعد الخشني) (fl. 685 – 724) was an Arab administrator of the Umayyad Caliphate who proposed and implemented the conversion of Syria's dīwān (tax administration) from Greek to Arabic in 700 under Caliph Abd al-Malik (r. 685–705). From the time of the Muslim conquest of the region from the Byzantine Empire in the 630s, Greek had remained the language of the bureaucracy in Syria and the change in 700 formed part of the wider centralization efforts undertaken by Abd al-Malik. In recognition of this achievement, Sulayman was appointed as the head of Syria's fiscal administration, replacing the Melkite Christian veteran Sarjun ibn Mansur. Sulayman continued in this office under caliphs al-Walid I (r. 705–715) and Sulayman (r. 715–717), the beginning of the reign of Umar II (r. 717–720) and then again through the reign of Yazid II (r. 720–724).

== Life ==
Sulayman was from the region of Palestine, in the territory of Jund al-Urdunn, a military district of Syria. The historian Moshe Gil speculates that he was from Tiberias, the administrative capital of Jund al-Urdunn. He was an Arab of the Khushayn tribe, which formed part of the larger Quda'a confederation long resident in Syria. His father, Sa'd, was a Christian and Sulayman too had possibly been a Christian. A number of traditional Muslim historians name him as the son of "Sa'id, mawla of al-Husayn", but this is an error, likely originating from a typographical mistake in an earlier source. According to the historian Martin Sprengling, Sulayman was well-versed in Arabic and Greek, as evidenced by the role he was assigned by Caliph Abd al-Malik as the katib (secretary) for official correspondence.

At the time of Sulayman's appointment, the head of the tax administration in Syria was Sarjun ibn Mansur al-Rumi, a native Melkite Christian who served under caliphs Mu'awiya I (r. 661–680), Yazid I (r. 680–683), Mu'awiya II (r. 683–684) and Abd al-Malik's father, Marwan I (r. 684–685). By dint of his experience and skill, Sarjun was kept in his post by Abd al-Malik for the majority of his reign. The caliph appointed Sulayman to the department of official correspondence and maintained closer relations with Sulayman, whom he had handpicked at a young age, than the elderly Sarjun, whom he inherited from previous administrations. Abd al-Malik had grown increasingly resentful of Sarjun's significant influence and perceived sense of indispensability and sought to dismiss him. According to the 9th-century Muslim historians al-Baladhuri and al-Mada'ini, when Abd al-Malik informed Sulayman of his dilemma with Sarjun, the former proposed to the caliph converting the language of the tax administration from Greek to Arabic. Unlike his Syria-centered predecessors, Abd al-Malik had spent most of his life in Medina, where only Arabic was spoken, and was unfamiliar with other languages or with the Greek and Syrian officials who had dominated the administration in Syria since the Byzantine era. Moreover, following his victory in the Second Muslim Civil War in 692, he embarked on a major centralization drive, which came with measures to unify the caliphate's widely varied tax systems. Already in 697, the transition from Persian to Arabic in the Iraqi bureaucracy had been carried out by Salih ibn Abd al-Rahman under Abd al-Malik's governor al-Hajjaj ibn Yusuf and possibly served as a model for Sulayman to emulate. To cover the expenses of the transition, Sulayman requested and received a year's worth of the revenues of Jund al-Urdunn, totaling some 180,000 gold dinars. The order had been kept secret from Sarjun and in less than a year Sulayman completed the transition in 700. Though Sarjun and his clerks were consequently dismissed, the Byzantine system was maintained and Greek-speaking officials with knowledge of Arabic were retained; the only major change was the language of the system.

In reward for his accomplishment, Abd al-Malik appointed Sulayman the head of Syria's fiscal administration, a post he held through the reigns of the caliph's sons and successors al-Walid I and Sulayman. After about one year into his reign, in 718/19, Caliph Umar II dismissed Sulayman for unknown reasons. He was reappointed by Caliph Yazid II and was apparently kept in the post until Yazid's death in 724, after which there is no further mention of Sulayman. His eldest son, Thabit, is briefly mentioned in 744 as holding an official post, the secretary of official correspondences under Caliph Yazid III, and had previously sheltered Yazid III in his Damascus residence during his rebellion against his predecessor, al-Walid II. In the aftermath of the Umayyad dynasty's downfall in 750, Sulayman's family disappears from the historical record.

== Bibliography ==
- Fishbein, Michael, ed. (1990). The History of al-Ṭabarī, Volume XXI: The Victory of the Marwānids, A.D. 685–693/A.H. 66–73. SUNY Series in Near Eastern Studies. Albany, New York: State University of New York Press. ISBN 978-0-7914-0221-4.
- Gibb, H. A. R. (1960). "ʿAbd al-Malik b. Marwān". In Gibb, H. A. R.; Kramers, J. H.; Lévi-Provençal, E.; Schacht, J.; Lewis, B. & Pellat, Ch. (eds.). The Encyclopaedia of Islam, Second Edition. Volume I: A–B. Leiden: E. J. Brill. pp. 76–77. OCLC 495469456.
- Gil, Moshe (1997) [1983]. A History of Palestine, 634–1099. Translated by Ethel Broido. Cambridge: Cambridge University Press. ISBN 0-521-59984-9.
- Hillenbrand, Carole, ed. (1989). The History of al-Ṭabarī, Volume XXVI: The Waning of the Umayyad Caliphate: Prelude to Revolution, A.D. 738–744/A.H. 121–126. SUNY Series in Near Eastern Studies. Albany, New York: State University of New York Press. ISBN 978-0-88706-810-2.
- Sprengling, M. (April 1939). "From Persian to Arabic". The American Journal of Semitic Languages and Literatures. 56 (2). The University of Chicago Press: 175–224. doi:10.1086/370538. JSTOR 528934.
- Wellhausen, Julius (1927). The Arab Kingdom and Its Fall. Translated by Margaret Graham Weir. Calcutta: University of Calcutta. OCLC 752790641.
