= Mansur ibn Sarjun =

Mansur ibn Sarjun was a Byzantine fiscal official or governor of Damascus of local Syrian Arab origin under emperors Maurice (r. 582–602) and Heraclius (r. 610–641), as well as during the Persian occupation of Damascus in 614–628. He surrendered the city to the besieging Arab Muslims in 635, having first secured the safe conduct of the local inhabitants. For his role in the surrender, he was maligned in Christian circles. Mansur's family remained prominent under Muslim rule, with his son Sarjun serving as a high-ranking official in Syria under the early Umayyad caliphs and his grandson John of Damascus attaining prominence as one of the major Christian thinkers of his time.

== Life ==
Mansur was a local Syrian of Arab origins, and was fluent in Aramaic, Greek and Arabic. According to the 10th-century Melkite historian Eutychius of Alexandria, Mansur was appointed a fiscal official in Damascus by the Byzantine emperor Maurice. He retained this position after the Sasanian Persians conquered Damascus in c. 614 and throughout their occupation of the city. During this period, he continued to remit the taxes of his jurisdiction to the Sasanians. The Byzantines regained control of Damascus in 628, and two years later, when Emperor Heraclius visited the city, he had Mansur jailed and tortured to pressure him to reimburse the taxes remitted to the Sasanians. In exchange, Mansur retained his office. Eutychius claims Mansur harbored "anger" toward the Emperor as a result of this episode. This was held to have contributed to his opposition to proffer funds to Heraclius's general Vahan, who was leading the Byzantine defense efforts against the Arab Muslims, who launched an invasion of Syria in c. 634.

During the Muslim siege of Damascus, Mansur is mentioned in several Muslim and Christian sources as the leader of the city's inhabitants who opened negotiations with the Muslim commander Khalid ibn al-Walid. In September 635, he opened the Bab Sharqi (Eastern Gate) of the city to Khalid after the two signed a capitulation agreement, which guaranteed the safety of the city's inhabitants and properties. The safe conduct excluded the Byzantine troops defending Damascus, who subsequently fled the city. Eutychius noted that as a result of Mansur's role in the surrender, "all the patriarchs and bishops in the world anathematized him". The 9th-century Syriac historian and patriarch Dionysius of Tel Mahre also names Mansur as the city official who surrendered Damascus, but while Eutychius viewed Mansur's act as treachery, Dionysius described it as a means to secure the safety and welfare of the inhabitants.

== Descendants ==
Mansur founded a family of high prominence in Damascus. The family remained Melkites, i.e. orthodox Christians of the imperial Byzantine rite. Mansur's son Sarjun was appointed the katib (scribe or secretary) of Mu'awiya ibn Abi Sufyan, the governor of Damascus and eventually all of Islamic Syria from c. 639 through his accession as the first Umayyad caliph in 661 and until the caliph's death in 680. Sarjun kept his office under Mu'awiya's successors Yazid I, Mu'awiya II, Marwan I and Abd al-Malik, the last of whom dismissed Sarjun around 700. Sarjun's son, John of Damascus (d. 749), was a prominent Christian thinker. Under Abbasid rule, which replaced Umayyad rule in 750, two other descendants of Mansur served as patriarchs of Jerusalem: Sergius I (r. 842–858) and Elias III (r. 879–907).

== Bibliography ==
- Griffith, Sidney H. (2016). "The Manṣūr Family and Saint John of Damascus: Christians and Muslims in Umayyad Times". In Borrut, Antoine; Donner, Fred M. (eds.). Christians and Others in the Umayyad State. Chicago: The Oriental Institute of the University of Chicago. pp. 29–52. ISBN 978-1-614910-31-2.
- Janosik, Daniel J. (2016). John of Damascus, First Apologist to the Muslims: The Trinity and Christian Apologetics in the Early Islamic Period. Eugene, Oregon: Pickwick Publications. ISBN 978-1-4982-8984-9.
- Zein, Ibrahim; El-Wakil, Ahmed (2020). "Khālid b. al-Wālid's Treaty with the People of Damascus: Identifying the Source Document through Shared and Competing Historical Memories". Journal of Islamic Studies. 31 (3): 295–328. doi:10.1093/jis/etaa029.
