= Sarjun ibn Mansur =

7th century Umayyad Caliphate Melkite Christian official

Sarjun ibn Mansur (Arabic: سرجون بن منصور Greek: Σέργιος ὁ τοῦ Μανσοῦρ) was a Melkite Christian official of the early Umayyad Caliphate. The son of a prominent Byzantine official of Damascus, he was a favourite of the early Umayyad caliphs Mu'awiya I and Yazid I, and served as the head of the fiscal administration for Syria from the mid-7th century until the year 700, when Caliph Abd al-Malik ibn Marwan dismissed him as part of his efforts to arabize the administration of the Caliphate.

He was the father of the theologian John of Damascus and adoptive father of Cosmas of Maiuma.

== Origin ==
Sarjun (Note: The name "Sarjun" is the Syriac form of the name of Sargon II as recorded in the Peshitta version of Isaiah 20:1.) was the son of Mansur ibn Sarjun, a Melkite Syrian (Note: The name "Mansur" points to an Arab origin. The family was clearly native of Syria, and its native language was Arabic, although they also knew Greek, the language of Byzantine administration and the Church.) Christian who held senior administrative offices in Damascus throughout the early 7th century: appointed as a fiscal official by the Byzantine emperor Maurice (r. 582–602), he retained his prominent position in the city during the Persian occupation of the city after 613, and even after the Byzantine recovery in 630. According to Eutychius of Alexandria, it was he who surrendered the city to the nascent Muslim caliphate under Khalid ibn al-Walid in 635.

== Career ==
Sarjun's own life is known from the hagiographies of his son and adoptive son, as well as scattered and brief references in historical sources. According to the Muslim historians al-Baladhuri and al-Tabari, Sarjun was a mawla of the first Umayyad caliph, Mu'awiya I (r. 661–680), (Note: Mu'awiya I was generally favourably disposed towards Christians and, according to al-Ya'qubi, the first Muslim caliph to employ Christians in administrative positions.) serving as his "secretary and the person in charge of his business". The hagiographies, although less reliable, also assign to him a role in the administration, even as "ruler" (archon or even amir), of Damascus and its environs, where he was responsible for collecting the revenue. In this capacity, he is attested in later collections of source material such as that of al-Mas'udi.

The hagiographies insist that he enjoyed high favour among the caliph's family, so that his family was not obliged to convert to Islam, although they disagree with each other on whether Sarjun baptized his son openly or in secret. Some accounts even mention Sarjun, along with the Christian poet al-Akhtal, as the youth companions of Mu'awiya's son and successor, Yazid I (r. 680–683). He possessed large estates across the Levant, and used his wealth to ransom Christian prisoners, among them the monk Cosmas, whom he entrusted with the teaching of his sons.

The 12th-century chronicler Michael the Syrian reports (II.492) that he persecuted the followers of the Jacobite Church at Damascus and Emesa, Another late Syriac source, the Chronicle of 1234, also reports that he adopted the teachings of Maximus the Confessor, which became official doctrine at the Third Council of Constantinople in 681, and zealously promoted them in Jerusalem, Antioch, and Edessa. It is difficult, however, to discern whether these activities are correctly attributed to him, or the result of confusion with his son, John of Damascus.

The Byzantine chronicler Theophanes the Confessor mentions Sarjun for the year 691/92 as the chief treasury minister of Caliph Abd al-Malik ibn Marwan (r. 685–705), giving him the equivalent Byzantine title of genikos logothetes. According to the narrative of Theophanes, Abd al-Malik sought to repair the Ka'aba in Mecca, which had been damaged during the recent Second Muslim Civil War, and for this purpose intended to remove some columns from a Christian shrine at Gethsemane. Sarjun, along with another leading Christian, Patrikios from Palestine, successfully prevented this by petitioning the Byzantine emperor, Justinian II (r. 685–695, 705–711), to supply other columns instead.

It appears thus that Sarjun remained in charge of the fiscal administration of Syria under five different caliphs—Mu'awiya I, Yazid I, Mu'awiya II, Marwan I, and Abd al-Malik—and for a period of almost half a century: his tenure may have begun as early as 650/51, and appears to have ended when Abd al-Malik decided to Arabicize the bureaucracy in 700, appointing Sulayman ibn Sa'd al-Khushani as his replacement.
