= Umayyad Caliphate =

Second Islamic caliphate (661–750)

Umayyad Caliphate ٱلْخِلَافَة ٱلْأُمَوِيَّة (Arabic) Al-Khilāfa al-Umawiyya
- 661–750
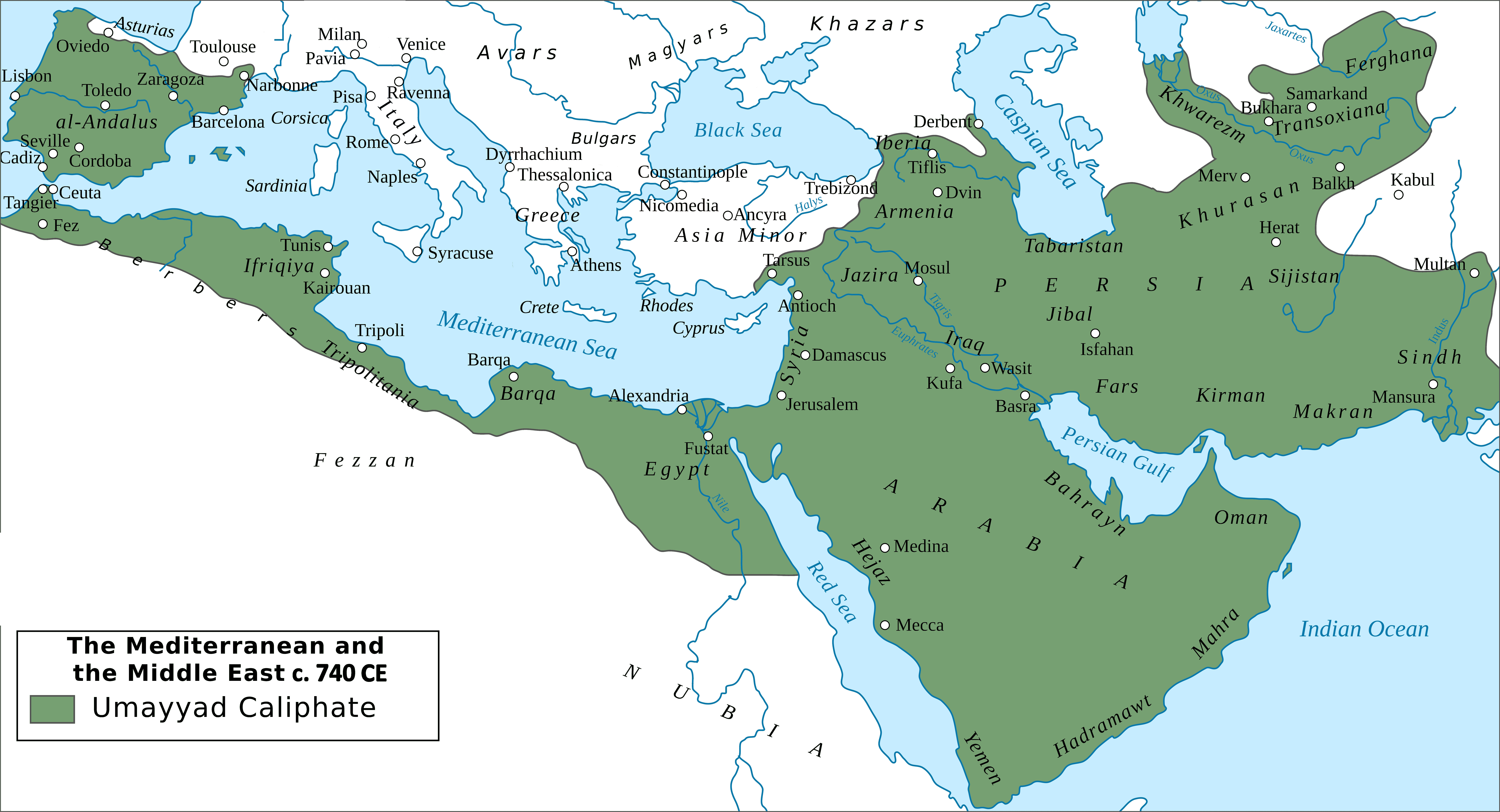
- The Umayyad Caliphate at its greatest extent
- Status: Caliphate
- Capital: Damascus (661–744); Harran (744–750)
- Official languages: Arabic
- Common languages: List: Middle Persian (administrative until c. 697); Medieval Greek (administrative until c. 700–705); Coptic (administrative until c. 705)
- Religion: Islam (state)
- Government: Hereditary monarchy
- Caliph
  - 661–680: Mu'awiya I (first)
  - 744–750: Marwan II (last)
- History
  - Mu'awiya I wins the First Fitna: 661
  - Abd al-Malik wins the Second Fitna: 692
  - Conquest of North Africa: 698
  - Conquests of Hispania and Sindh: 711
  - Conquest of Transoxiana: 737
  - Abbasid revolution: 750

Area
- 720: 11,100,000–15,000,000 km^{2} (4,300,000–5,800,000 sq mi)
- Currency: Dinar (gold coin); Dirham (silver coin); Fils (copper coin)
Preceded by
Rashidun Caliphate
Exarchate of Africa
Visigothic Kingdom
Kingdom of the Aurès
Kingdom of Altava
Chacha dynasty
Succeeded by
Abbasid Caliphate
Emirate of Córdoba
Barghawata
Emirate of Nekor
Emirate of Tlemcen
Fihrids
Rustamid dynasty

The Umayyad Caliphate, or the Umayyad Empire (US: /uːˈmaɪæd/; Arabic: ٱلْخِلَافَة ٱلْأُمَوِيَّة, romanized: al-Khilāfa al-Umawiyya), was the second Islamic caliphate, ruled by the Umayyad dynasty (Note: (Arabic: ٱلْأُمَوِيُّون, romanized: al-Umawiyyūn, or بَنُو أُمَيَّة, Banū Umayya, 'sons of Umayya').) from 661 to 750. It succeeded the Rashidun Caliphate, whose third caliph, Uthman ibn Affan (r. 644–656), was also a member of the Umayyad clan. The Umayyad family established hereditary rule under Mu'awiya ibn Abi Sufyan, the long-time governor of Syria, who became caliph in 661 after emerging victorious in the First Fitna. Syria served as the caliphate's metropolitan province thereafter, with Damascus as its capital.

Umayyad authority was later challenged in the Second Fitna, during which the Sufyanid line of Mu'awiya (which includes only the first three Umayyad caliphs) was replaced in 684 by Marwan ibn al-Hakam, who founded the Marwanid line that became the ruling Umayyad house henceforth. His eldest son and successor Abd al-Malik ibn Marwan restored Umayyad control over the Caliphate after defeating the Zubayrids in 692. Abd al-Malik made key reforms to the administrative structure of the caliphate, including the centralization of caliphal power, the restructuring of the military, and policies of Arabization and Islamization within the bureaucracy.

The Umayyads advanced the early Muslim conquests, conquering the Maghreb, the Iberian Peninsula, Central Asia and Sindh. At its greatest extent, the Umayyad Caliphate covered an area of 11,000,000–15,000,000 km^{2} (4,300,000–5,790,000 sq mi), making it one of the largest empires in history. However, the constant warfare exhausted the caliphate's resources, while revolts and tribal rivalries weakened it from within. In 750, the Abbasids overthrew Caliph Marwan II, and most of the Umayyad family were slain. But in 756, Abd al-Rahman I, a grandson of Caliph Hisham ibn Abd al-Malik, established an independent state in al-Andalus with its capital at Córdoba, which became a major center of science, medicine, philosophy and invention during the Islamic Golden Age.

The Umayyads ruled over a vast multiethnic and multicultural population. Christians, who still constituted a majority of the caliphate's population, and Jews were allowed to practice their own religion in exchange for the payment of jizya, from which Muslims were exempt. Muslims were required to pay the zakat, which was explicitly collected for the purposes of charity and for the benefit of Muslims or Muslim converts. Under the early Umayyad caliphs, prominent administrative positions were held by Christians, some of whom belonged to families that had served under the Byzantines. The employment of Christians was part of a broader policy of religious toleration that was necessitated by the presence of large Christian populations in the conquered provinces, including in their heartland of Syria. This policy also helped to increase Mu'awiya's popularity and solidified Syria as his power base. The Umayyad era is often considered the formative period of Islamic art and architecture.

== History ==
=== Origins ===
==== Early influence ====
During the pre-Islamic period, the Banu Umayya were a leading clan of the Quraysh tribe of Mecca. By the end of the 6th century, the Umayyads dominated the Quraysh's increasingly prosperous trade networks with Syria and developed economic and military alliances with the nomadic Arab tribes that controlled the northern and central Arabian desert expanses, affording the clan a degree of political power in the region. The Umayyads under the leadership of Abu Sufyan ibn Harb were the principal leaders of Meccan opposition to the Islamic prophet Muhammad, but after the latter captured Mecca in 630, Abu Sufyan and the Quraysh embraced Islam. To reconcile his influential Qurayshi tribesmen, Muhammad gave his former opponents, including Abu Sufyan, a stake in the new order. Abu Sufyan and the Umayyads relocated to Medina, the political centre of Islam, to maintain their new-found political influence in the nascent Muslim community.

Muhammad's death in 632 left open the succession of leadership of the Muslim community. Leaders of the Ansar, the natives of Medina who had provided Muhammad safe haven after his emigration from Mecca in 622, discussed forwarding their own candidate out of concern that the Muhajirun, Muhammad's early followers and fellow emigrants from Mecca, would ally with their fellow tribesmen from the former Qurayshi elite and take control of the Muslim state. The Muhajirun gave allegiance to one of their own, the early, elderly companion of Muhammad, Abu Bakr (r. 632–634), and put an end to Ansarite deliberations. Abu Bakr was viewed as acceptable by the Ansar and the Qurayshi elite and was acknowledged as caliph (leader of the Muslim community). He showed favor to the Umayyads by awarding them command roles in the Muslim conquest of Syria. The appointees included Yazid and Mu'awiya, the sons of Abu Sufyan, who owned property and maintained trade networks in Syria.

Abu Bakr's successor Umar (r. 634–644) curtailed the influence of the Qurayshi elite in favor of Muhammad's earlier supporters in the administration and military, but nonetheless allowed the growing foothold of Abu Sufyan's sons in Syria, which was all but conquered by 638. When Umar's overall steward of the province, Abu Ubayda ibn al-Jarrah, died in 639, he appointed Yazid as governor of the districts of Damascus, Palestine and Jordan. Yazid died shortly after and Umar appointed Yazid's brother Mu'awiya in his place. Umar's exceptional treatment of Abu Sufyan's sons may have stemmed from his respect for the family, their burgeoning alliance with the powerful Banu Kalb tribe as a counterbalance to the influential Himyarite settlers in Homs who viewed themselves as equals to the Quraysh in nobility, or the lack of a suitable candidate at the time, particularly amid the plague of Amwas which had already killed Abu Ubayda and Yazid. Under Mu'awiya's stewardship, Syria remained domestically peaceful, well-organized and securely defended from its former Byzantine rulers.

==== Caliphate of Uthman ====
Map of Islamic Syria (Bilad al-Sham), the metropole of the Umayyad Caliphate. Its founder, Mu'awiya I, had originally been governor of the junds (military districts) of Damascus (Dimashq) and Jordan (al-Urdunn) in 639 before gaining authority over the rest of Syria's junds during the caliphate of Uthman (644–656), a member of the Umayyad family.

Umar's successor, Uthman ibn Affan, was a wealthy Umayyad and early Muslim convert with marital ties to Muhammad. He was elected by the shura council, composed of Muhammad's cousin Ali ibn Abi Talib, Zubayr ibn al-Awwam, Talha ibn Ubayd Allah, Sa'd ibn Abi Waqqas and Abd al-Rahman ibn Awf, all of whom were close, early companions of Muhammad and belonged to the Quraysh. He was chosen over Ali because he would ensure the concentration of state power into the hands of the Quraysh, as opposed to Ali's determination to diffuse power among all of the Muslim factions. From early in his reign, Uthman displayed explicit favoritism to his kinsmen, in stark contrast to his predecessors. He appointed his relatives as governors over the conquered regions, namely much of the Sasanian Empire, i.e. Iraq and Iran, and the former Byzantine territories of Syria and Egypt. In Medina, he relied extensively on the counsel of his Umayyad cousins, the brothers al-Harith and Marwan ibn al-Hakam. According to the historian Wilferd Madelung, this policy stemmed from Uthman's "conviction that the house of Umayya, as the core clan of Quraysh, was uniquely qualified to rule in the name of Islam".

Uthman's nepotism provoked the ire of the Ansar and the members of the shura. In 645/46, he added the Jazira (Upper Mesopotamia) to Mu'awiya's Syrian governorship and granted the latter's request to take possession of all Byzantine crown lands in Syria to help pay his troops. He had the surplus taxes from the wealthy provinces of Kufa and Egypt forwarded to the treasury in Medina, which he used at his personal disposal, frequently disbursing its funds and war booty to his family members. Moreover, the lucrative Sasanian crown lands of Iraq, which Umar had designated as communal property for the benefit of the Arab garrison towns of Kufa and Basra, were turned into caliphal crown lands to be used at Uthman's discretion. Mounting resentment against Uthman's rule in Iraq and Egypt and among the Ansar and Quraysh of Medina culminated in the killing of the caliph in 656. In the assessment of the historian Hugh N. Kennedy, Uthman was killed because of his determination to centralize control over the caliphate's government by the traditional elite of the Quraysh, particularly his Umayyad clan, which he believed possessed the "experience and ability" to govern, at the expense of the interests, rights and privileges of many early Muslims.

==== First Fitna ====
After Uthman's assassination, Ali was recognized as caliph in Medina, though his support stemmed from the Ansar and the Iraqis, while the bulk of the Quraysh was wary of his rule. The first challenge to his authority came from the Qurayshi leaders Zubayr and Talha, who had opposed Uthman's empowerment of the Umayyad clan but feared that their own influence and the power of the Quraysh, in general, would dissipate under Ali. Backed by one of Muhammad's wives, Aisha, they attempted to rally support against Ali among the troops of Basra, prompting the caliph to leave for Iraq's other garrison town, Kufa, where he could better confront his challengers. Ali defeated them at the Battle of the Camel, in which Zubayr and Talha were slain, and Aisha consequently entered self-imposed seclusion. Ali's sovereignty was thereafter recognized in Basra and Egypt, and he established Kufa as his capital.

Although Ali was able to replace Uthman's governors in Egypt and Iraq with relative ease, Mu'awiya had developed a strong power base and an effective military against the Byzantines from the Arab tribes of Syria. Mu'awiya did not yet explicitly claim the caliphate but was determined to retain control of Syria and opposed Ali in the name of avenging his kinsman Uthman, accusing the caliph of complicity in his death. Ali's Iraqi army and Mu'awiya's Syrian forces fought to a stalemate at the Battle of Siffin in early 657. Ali agreed to settle the matter with Mu'awiya by arbitration, though the talks failed to achieve a resolution. The decision to arbitrate fundamentally weakened Ali's political position as he was compelled to negotiate with Mu'awiya on equal terms, while it drove a faction of Ali's forces, who later became known as the Kharijites, to revolt. Ali's coalition steadily disintegrated and many Iraqi tribal nobles secretly defected to Mu'awiya, while Mu'awiya's ally Amr ibn al-As conquered Egypt from Ali's governor in July 658. In July 660 Mu'awiya was formally recognized as caliph in Jerusalem by his Syrian tribal allies. Ali was assassinated by a Kharijite dissident in January 661. His son Hasan succeeded him but abdicated in return for compensation upon Mu'awiya's invasion of Iraq with his Syrian army in the summer. Mu'awiya then entered Kufa and received the allegiance of the Iraqis.

=== Sufyanid period ===
==== Caliphate of Mu'awiya ====
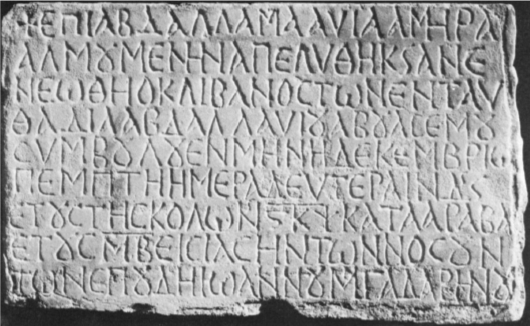
A Greek inscription crediting Mu'awiya for restoring Roman bathhouses at Hammat Gader near Tiberias in 663, the only known epigraphic attestation to Mu'awiya's rule in Syria

The recognition of Mu'awiya in Kufa, referred to as the "year of unification of the community" in the Muslim traditional sources, is generally considered the start of his caliphate. With his accession, the political capital and the caliphal treasury were transferred to Damascus, the seat of Mu'awiya's power. Syria's emergence as the heartland of the Umayyad Caliphate was the result of Mu'awiya's twenty-year entrenchment in the province, the geographic distribution of its relatively large Arab population throughout the province in contrast to their seclusion in garrison cities in other provinces, and the domination of a single tribal confederation, the Quda'a who were led by the Banu Kalb with whom Mu'awiya had a marriage alliance, as opposed to the wide array of competing tribal groups in Iraq. The long-established, formerly Christian Arab tribes in Syria, having been integrated into the military of the Byzantine Empire and their Ghassanid client kings, were "more accustomed to order and obedience" than their Iraqi counterparts, according to historian Julius Wellhausen. Mu'awiya relied on the powerful Kalbite chief Ibn Bahdal and the Kindite nobleman Shurahbil ibn Simt alongside the Qurayshi commanders al-Dahhak ibn Qays al-Fihri and Abd al-Rahman, the son of the prominent general Khalid ibn al-Walid, to guarantee the loyalty of the key military components of Syria. Mu'awiya preoccupied his core Syrian troops in nearly annual or bi-annual land and sea raids against Byzantium, which provided them with battlefield experience and war spoils, but secured no permanent territorial gains. Toward the end of his reign the caliph entered a thirty-year truce with Byzantine emperor Constantine IV (r. 668–685), obliging the Umayyads to pay the Empire an annual tribute of gold, horses and slaves.

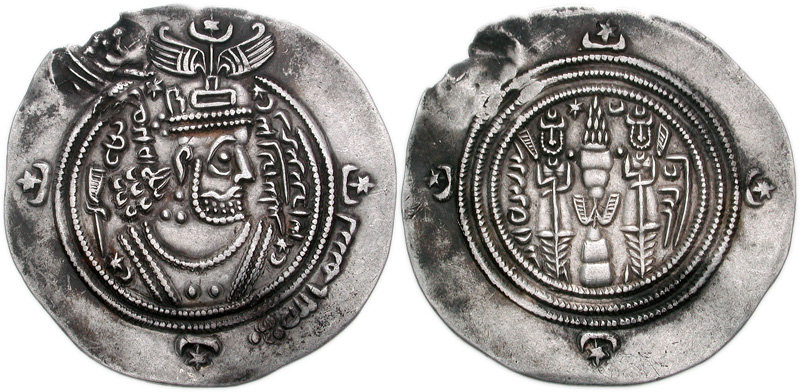
Arab-Sasanian-style Umayyad coin minted in Basra in 675/76 during the caliphate of Mu'awiya I, in the name of the Umayyad governor Ubayd Allah ibn Ziyad. The latter's governorship later spanned all of the eastern caliphate. His father Ziyad ibn Abihi was adopted as a half-brother by Mu'awiya I, who made him his practical viceroy over the eastern caliphate.

Mu'awiya's main challenge was reestablishing the unity of the Muslim community and asserting his authority and that of the caliphate in the provinces amid the political and social disintegration of the First Fitna. There remained significant opposition to his assumption of the caliphate and to a strong central government. The garrison towns of Kufa and Basra, populated by the Arab immigrants and troops who arrived during the conquest of Iraq in the 630s–640s, resented the transition of power to Syria. They remained divided, nonetheless, as both cities competed for power and influence in Iraq and its eastern dependencies and remained divided between the Arab tribal nobility and the early Muslim converts, the latter of whom were divided between the pro-Alids (loyalists of Ali) and the Kharijites, who followed their own strict interpretation of Islam. The caliph applied a decentralized approach to governing Iraq by forging alliances with its tribal nobility, such as the Kufan leader al-Ash'ath ibn Qays, and entrusting the administration of Kufa and Basra to highly experienced members of the Thaqif tribe, al-Mughira ibn Shu'ba and the latter's protege Ziyad ibn Abihi (whom Mu'awiya adopted as his half-brother), respectively. In return for recognizing his suzerainty, maintaining order, and forwarding a token portion of the provincial tax revenues to Damascus, the caliph let his governors rule with practical independence. After al-Mughira's death in 670, Mu'awiya attached Kufa and its dependencies to the governorship of Basra, making Ziyad the practical viceroy over the eastern half of the caliphate. Ziyad launched a concerted campaign to firmly establish Arab rule in the vast Khurasan region east of Iran and restart the Muslim conquests in the surrounding areas. Not long after Ziyad's death, he was succeeded by his son Ubayd Allah ibn Ziyad. Meanwhile, Amr ibn al-As ruled Egypt from the provincial capital of Fustat as a virtual partner of Mu'awiya until his death in 663, after which loyalist governors were appointed and the province became a practical appendage of Syria. In 670, the Muslim conquest of Ifriqiya (central North Africa) was launched by the commander Uqba ibn Nafi, which extended Umayyad control as far as Byzacena (modern southern Tunisia), where Uqba founded the permanent Arab garrison city of Kairouan.

==== Succession of Yazid I and collapse of Sufyanid power ====
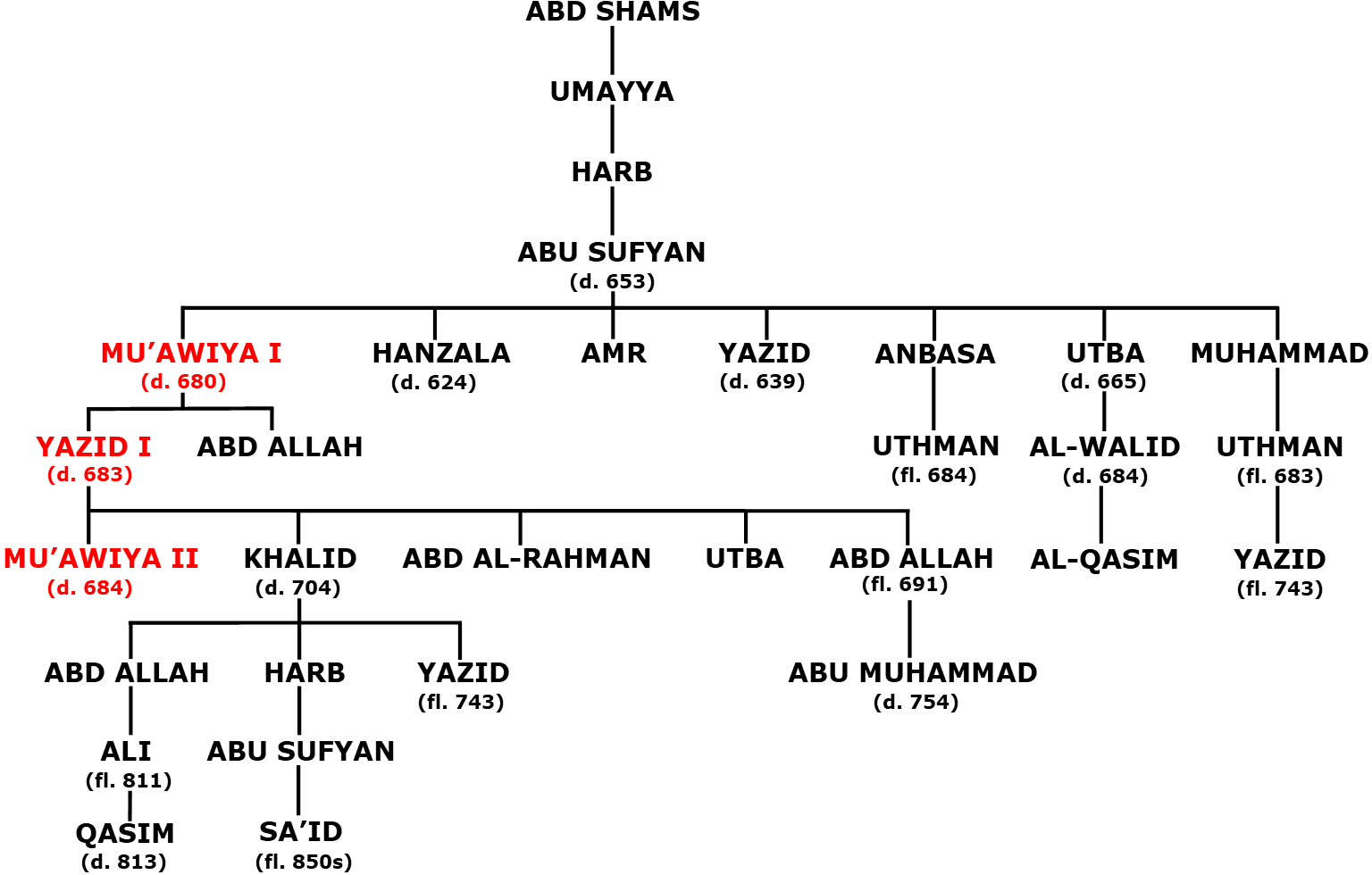
Genealogical tree of the Sufyanids. The names in red indicate caliphs.

In contrast to Uthman, Mu'awiya restricted the influence of his Umayyad kinsmen to the governorship of Medina, where the dispossessed Islamic elite, including the Umayyads, was suspicious or hostile toward his rule. However, in an unprecedented move in Islamic politics, Mu'awiya nominated his own son, Yazid I, as his successor in 676, introducing hereditary rule to caliphal succession and, in practice, turning the office of the caliph into a kingship. The act was met with disapproval or opposition by the Iraqis and the Hejaz-based Quraysh, including the Umayyads, but most were bribed or coerced into acceptance. Yazid acceded after Mu'awiya's death in 680 and almost immediately faced a challenge to his rule by the Kufan partisans of Ali who had invited Ali's son and Muhammad's grandson Husayn to stage a revolt against Umayyad rule from Iraq. An army mobilized by Iraq's governor Ubayd Allah ibn Ziyad intercepted and killed Husayn outside Kufa at the Battle of Karbala. Although it stymied active opposition to Umayyad authority in Iraq for the time being, the killing of Muhammad's grandson left many Muslims outraged and significantly increased Kufan hostility toward the Umayyads and sympathy for the family of Ali.

The next major challenge to Yazid's rule emanated from the Hejaz where Abd Allah ibn al-Zubayr, the son of Zubayr ibn al-Awwam and grandson of Abu Bakr, advocated for a shura among the Quraysh to elect the caliph and rallied opposition to the Umayyads from his headquarters in Islam's holiest sanctuary, the Ka'aba in Mecca. The Ansar and Quraysh of Medina also took up the anti-Umayyad cause and in 683 expelled the Umayyads from the city. Yazid's Syrian troops routed the Medinans at the Battle of al-Harra and subsequently plundered Medina before besieging Ibn al-Zubayr in Mecca. The Syrians withdrew upon news of Yazid's death in 683, after which Ibn al-Zubayr declared himself caliph and soon after gained recognition in most provinces of the caliphate, including Iraq and Egypt. In Syria Ibn Bahdal secured the succession of Yazid's son and appointed successor Mu'awiya II, whose authority was likely restricted to Damascus and Syria's southern districts. Mu'awiya II had been ill from the beginning of his accession, with al-Dahhak assuming the practical duties of his office, and he died in early 684 without naming a successor. His death marked the end of the Umayyads' Sufyanid ruling house, called after Mu'awiya I's father Abu Sufyan. (Note: The eldest surviving Sufyanid, Al-Walid ibn Utba ibn Abi Sufyan, the son of Mu'awiya I's full brother, died shortly after Mu'awiya II's death, while another paternal uncle of the deceased caliph, Uthman ibn Anbasa ibn Abi Sufyan, who had support from the Kalb of the Jordan district, recognized the caliphate of his maternal uncle Ibn al-Zubayr. Ibn Bahdal favored Mu'awiya II's brothers, Khalid and Abd Allah, for the succession, but they were viewed as too young and inexperienced by most of the pro-Umayyad tribal nobility in Syria.)

=== Early Marwanid period ===
==== Marwanid transition and end of Second Fitna ====
Map of the Caliphate during the Second Fitna in c. 686. The area shaded in red represents the territory of the Umayyads, while the areas shaded in blue, green and yellow respectively represent the territories of the Mecca-based Caliph Abd Allah ibn al-Zubayr, the pro-Alid ruler of Kufa, Mukhtar al-Thaqafi, and the Kharijites.

Umayyad authority nearly collapsed in their Syrian stronghold after the death of Mu'awiya II. Al-Dahhak ibn Qays in Damascus, the Qaysi tribes in Qinnasrin (northern Syria) and the Jazira, the Judham in Palestine, and the Ansar and South Arabians of Homs all opted to recognize Ibn al-Zubayr. Marwan ibn al-Hakam, the leader of the Umayyads expelled to Syria from Medina, was prepared to submit to Ibn al-Zubayr as well but was persuaded to forward his candidacy for the caliphate by Ibn Ziyad. The latter had been driven out of Iraq and strove to uphold Umayyad rule. During a summit of pro-Umayyad Syrian tribes, namely the Quda'a and their Kindite allies, organized by Ibn Bahdal in the old Ghassanid capital of Jabiya, Marwan was elected as caliph in exchange for economic privileges to the loyalist tribes. At the subsequent Battle of Marj Rahit in August 684, Marwan led his tribal allies to a decisive victory against a much larger Qaysite army led by al-Dahhak, who was slain. Not long after, the South Arabians of Homs and the Judham joined the Quda'a to form the Yaman tribal conferderation. Marj Rahit led to the long-running conflict between the Qays and Yaman factions. The Qays regrouped in Circesium under Zufar ibn al-Harith al-Kilabi and moved to avenge their losses. Although Marwan regained full control of Syria in the months following the battle, the inter-tribal strife undermined the foundation of Umayyad power: the Syrian army.

In 685, Marwan and Ibn Bahdal expelled the Zubayrid governor of Egypt and replaced him with Marwan's son Abd al-Aziz, who ruled the province until his death in 704/05. Another son, Muhammad, was appointed to suppress Zufar's rebellion in the Jazira. Marwan died in April 685 and was succeeded by his eldest son Abd al-Malik. Although Ibn Ziyad attempted to restore the Syrian army, persistent divisions along Qays–Yaman lines contributed to the army's massive rout and Ibn Ziyad's death at the hands of the pro-Alid forces commanded by Ibrahim ibn al-Ashtar at the Battle of Khazir in August 686. The setback delayed Abd al-Malik's attempts to reestablish Umayyad authority in Iraq, while pressures from the Byzantine Empire and raids into Syria by the Byzantines' Mardaite allies compelled him to sign a peace treaty with Byzantium in 689 which substantially increased the Umayyads' annual tribute to the Empire. During his siege of Circesium in 691, Abd al-Malik reconciled with Zufar ibn al-Harith and the Qays by offering them privileged positions in the Umayyad court and army, signaling a new policy by the caliph and his successors to balance the interests of the Qays and Yaman in the Umayyad state. With his unified army, Abd al-Malik marched against the Zubayrids of Iraq, having already secretly secured the defection of the province's leading tribal chiefs, and defeated Iraq's ruler, Ibn al-Zubayr's brother Mus'ab, at the Battle of Maskin in 691. Afterward, the Umayyad commander al-Hajjaj ibn Yusuf besieged Mecca and killed Ibn al-Zubayr in 692, marking the end of the Second Fitna and the reunification of the caliphate under Abd al-Malik's rule.

==== Domestic consolidation and centralization ====
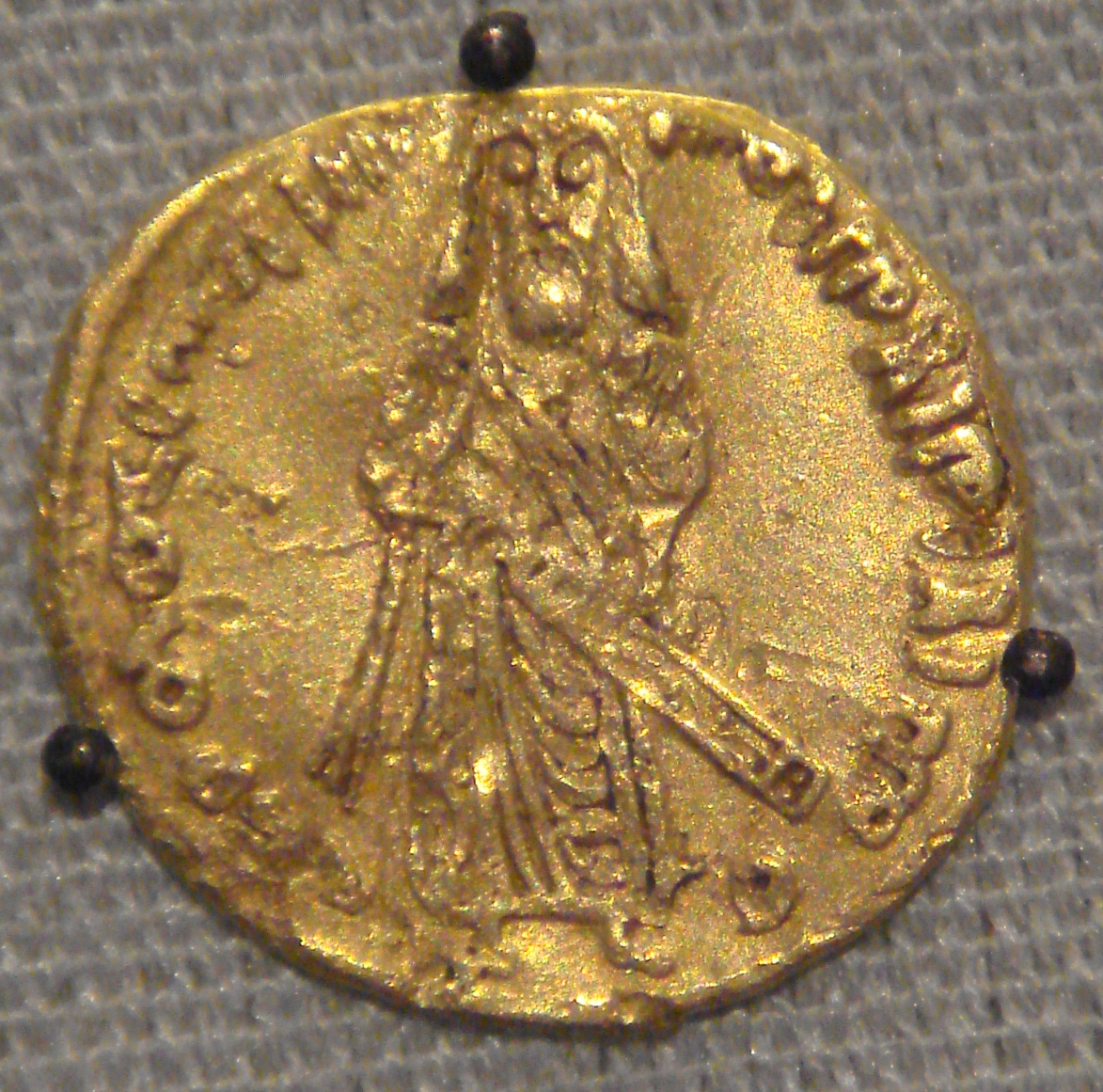
Abd al-Malik introduced an independent Islamic currency, the gold dinar, in 693, which originally depicted a human figure, likely the caliph, as shown in this coin minted in 695. In 697, the figural depictions were replaced solely by Qur'anic and other Islamic inscriptions.

Iraq remained politically unstable and the garrisons of Kufa and Basra had become exhausted by warfare with Kharijite rebels. In 694 Abd al-Malik combined both cities as a single province under the governorship of al-Hajjaj, who oversaw the suppression of the Kharijite revolts in Iraq and Iran by 698 and was subsequently given authority over the rest of the eastern caliphate. Resentment among the Iraqi troops towards al-Hajjaj's methods of governance, particularly his death threats to force participation in the war efforts and his reductions to their stipends, culminated with a mass Iraqi rebellion against the Umayyads in c. 700. The leader of the rebels was the Kufan nobleman Ibn al-Ash'ath, grandson of al-Ash'ath ibn Qays. Al-Hajjaj defeated Ibn al-Ash'ath's rebels at the Battle of Dayr al-Jamajim in April. The suppression of the revolt marked the end of the Iraqi muqātila as a military force and the beginning of Syrian military domination of Iraq. Iraqi internal divisions, and the utilization of more disciplined Syrian troops by Abd al-Malik and al-Hajjaj, voided the Iraqis' attempt to reassert power in the province.

To consolidate Umayyad rule after the Second Fitna, the Marwanids launched a series of centralization, Islamization and Arabization measures. These measures included the creation of multiple classes of Arabic-inscribed administrative media as a way to proliferate their particular political, cultural, and religious disposition to both Arab and non-Arab audiences. To prevent further rebellions in Iraq, al-Hajjaj founded a permanent Syrian garrison in Wasit, situated between Kufa and Basra, and instituted a more rigorous administration in the province. Power thereafter derived from the Syrian troops, who became Iraq's ruling class, while Iraq's Arab nobility, religious scholars and mawālī became their virtual subjects. The surplus from the agriculturally rich Sawad lands was redirected from the muqātila to the caliphal treasury in Damascus to pay the Syrian troops in Iraq. The system of military pay established by Umar, which paid stipends to veterans of the earlier Muslim conquests and their descendants, was ended, salaries being restricted to those in active service. The old system was considered a handicap on Abd al-Malik's executive authority and financial ability to reward loyalists in the army. Thus, a professional army was established during Abd al-Malik's reign whose salaries derived from tax proceeds.

In 693, the Byzantine gold solidus was replaced in Syria and Egypt with the dinar. Initially, the new coinage contained depictions of the caliph as the spiritual leader of the Muslim community and its supreme military commander. This image proved no less acceptable to Muslim officialdom and was replaced in 696 or 697 with image-less coinage inscribed with Qur'anic quotes and other Muslim religious formulas. In 698/699, similar changes were made to the silver dirhams issued by the Muslims in the former Sasanian Persian lands of the eastern caliphate. Arabic replaced Persian as the language of the dīwān in Iraq in 697, Greek in the Syrian dīwān in 700, and Greek and Coptic in the Egyptian dīwān in 705/706. Arabic ultimately became the sole official language of the Umayyad state, but the transition in faraway provinces, such as Khurasan, did not occur until the 740s. Although the official language was changed, Greek and Persian-speaking bureaucrats who were versed in Arabic kept their posts. According to Gibb, the decrees were the "first step towards the reorganization and unification of the diverse tax-systems in the provinces, and also a step towards a more definitely Muslim administration". Indeed, it formed an important part of the Islamization measures that lent the Umayyad Caliphate "a more ideological and programmatic coloring it had previously lacked", according to Blankinship.

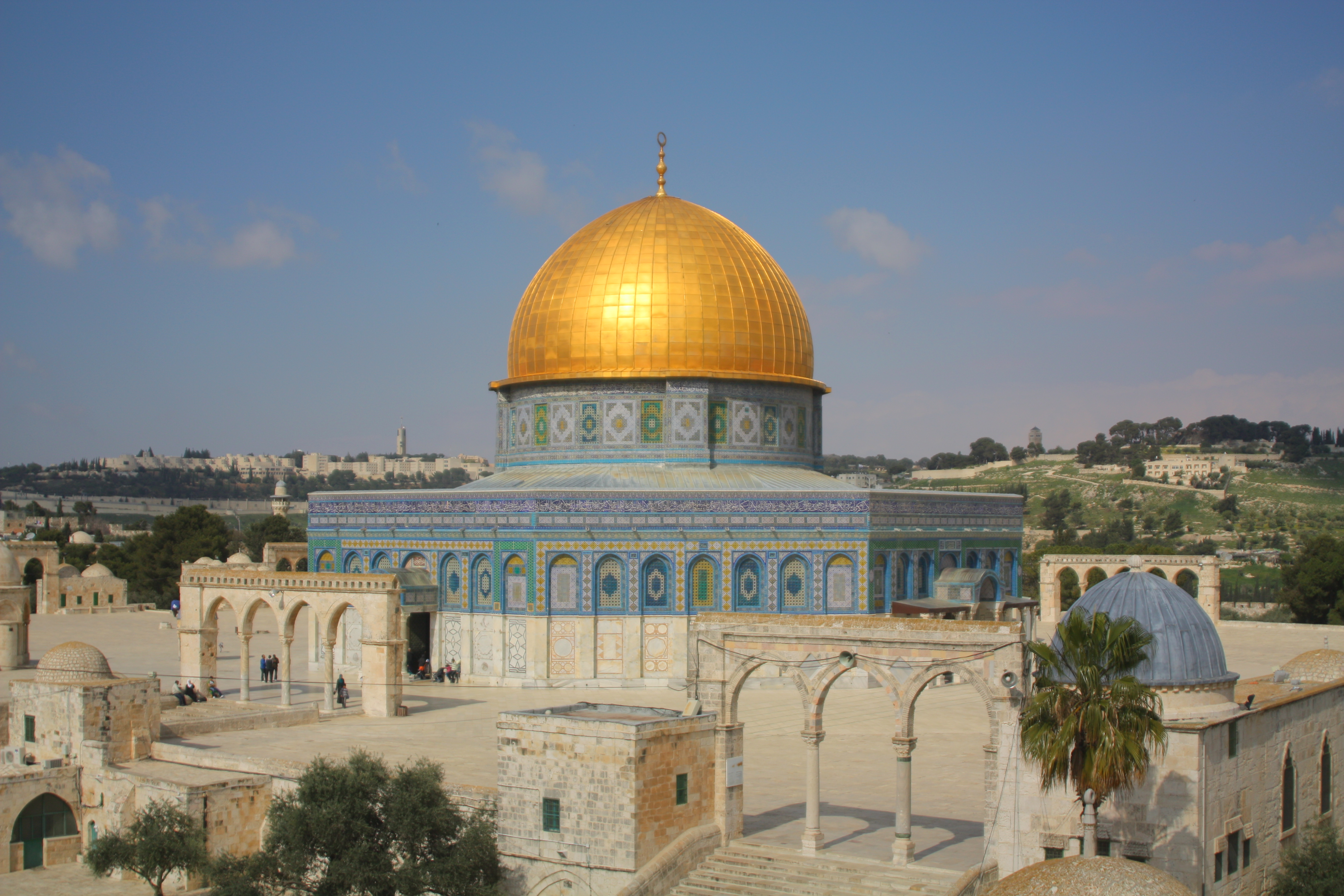
The Dome of the Rock, located within the Al-Aqsa Mosque compound in Jerusalem, is considered the oldest surviving major Islamic building.

In 691/692, Abd al-Malik completed the Dome of the Rock in Jerusalem. It was possibly intended as a monument of victory over the Christians that would distinguish Islam's uniqueness within the common Abrahamic setting of Jerusalem, home of the two older Abrahamic faiths, Judaism and Christianity. An alternative motive may have been to divert the religious focus of Muslims in the Umayyad realm from the Ka'aba in Zubayrid Mecca (683–692), where the Umayyads were routinely condemned during the Hajj. In Damascus, Abd al-Malik's son and successor al-Walid I (r. 705–715) confiscated the cathedral of St. John the Baptist and founded the Great Mosque in its place as a "symbol of the political supremacy and moral prestige of Islam", according to historian Nikita Elisséeff. Noting al-Walid's awareness of architecture's propaganda value, historian Robert Hillenbrand calls the Damascus mosque a "victory monument" intended as a "visible statement of Muslim supremacy and permanence".

==== Renewal of conquests ====
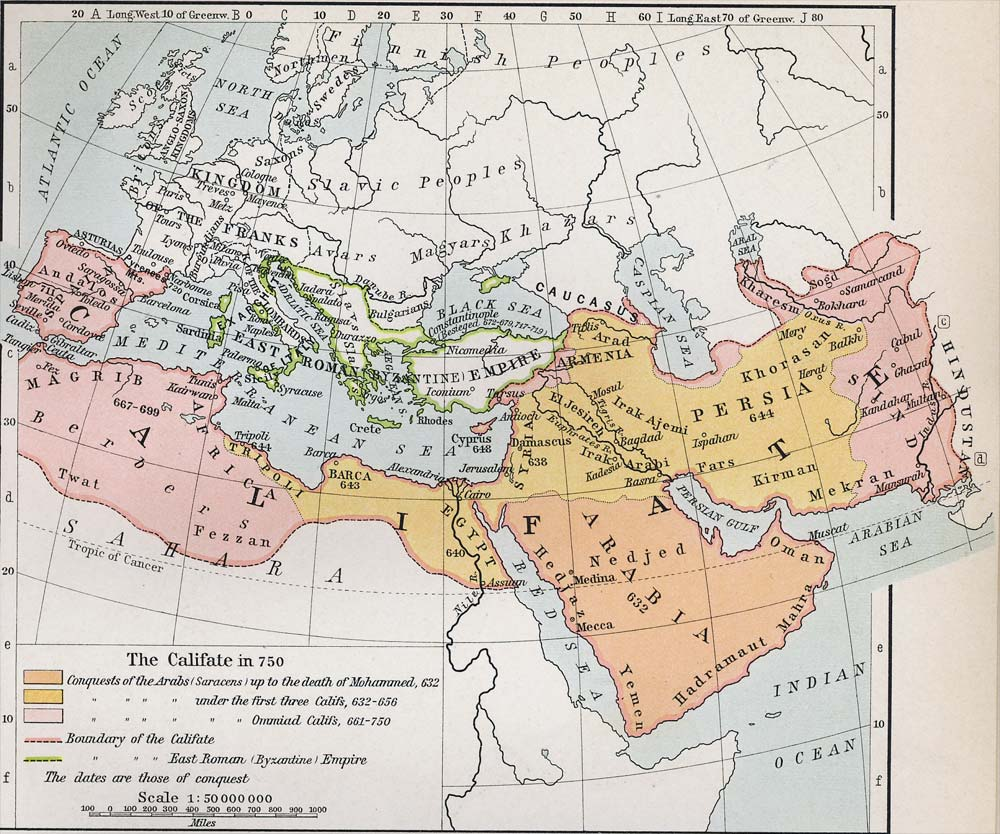
The expansion of the Muslim Caliphate until 750, from William R. Shepherd's Historical Atlas. Muslim state at the death of Muhammad Expansion under the Rashidun Caliphate Expansion under the Umayyad Caliphate Byzantine Empire

Under al-Walid I, the Umayyad Caliphate reached its greatest territorial extent. The war with the Byzantines had resumed under his father after the civil war, with the Umayyads defeating the Byzantines at the Battle of Sebastopolis in 692. The Umayyads frequently raided Byzantine Anatolia and Armenia in the following years. By 705, Armenia was annexed by the Caliphate along with the principalities of Caucasian Albania and Iberia, which collectively became the province of Arminiya. In 695–698, the commander Hassan ibn al-Nu'man restored Umayyad control over Ifriqiya after defeating the Byzantines and Berbers there. Carthage was captured and destroyed in 698, signaling "the final, irretrievable end of Roman power in Africa", according to Kennedy. Kairouan was firmly secured as a launchpad for later conquests, while the port town of Tunis was founded and equipped with an arsenal on Abd al-Malik's orders to establish a strong Arab fleet. Hassan ibn al-Nu'man continued the campaign against the Berbers, defeating them and killing their leader, the warrior queen Kahina, between 698 and 703. His successor in Ifriqiya, Musa ibn Nusayr, subjugated the Berbers of the Hawwara, Zenata and Kutama confederations and advanced into the Maghreb, conquering Tangier and Sus in 708/709. Musa's Berber mawla, Tariq ibn Ziyad, invaded the Visigothic Kingdom in 711 and within five years most of Hispania was conquered.

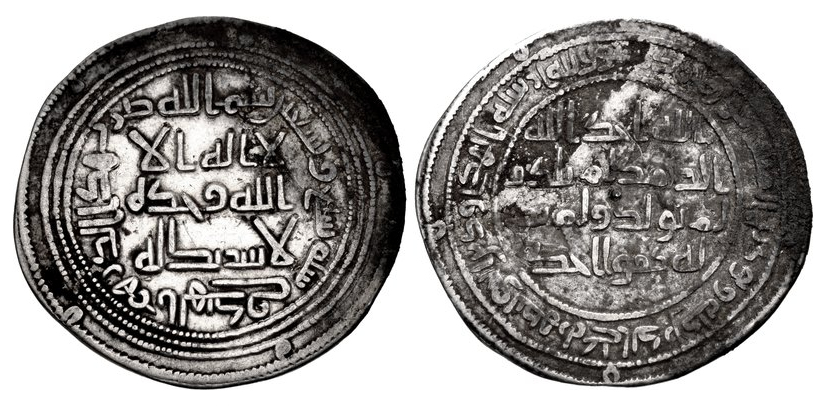
Umayyad coinage in India, from the time of the first governor of Sindh, Muhammad ibn al-Qasim. Minted in India (possibly in the city of Multan), dated AH 97 (715–716 CE): obverse circular legend "in the name of Allah, struck this dirham in al-Hind ( لهند l'Hind) in the year seven and ninety".

Al-Hajjaj managed the eastern expansion from Iraq. His lieutenant governor of Khurasan, Qutayba ibn Muslim, launched numerous campaigns against Transoxiana (Central Asia), which had been a largely impenetrable region for earlier Muslim armies, between 705 and 715. Despite the distance from the Arab garrison towns of Khurasan, the unfavorable terrain and climate and his enemies' numerical superiority, Qutayba, through his persistent raids, gained the surrender of Bukhara in 706–709, Khwarazm and Samarkand in 711–712 and Farghana in 713. During Qutayba's campaigns in conquering the Bukharan territories of Numushkat and Ramithna in 707 CE (88 AH), he faced a coalition force of Turks and the Tang Empire. their army roughly numbered 200,000 soldiers of Ferghana and Sogdiana, led by Kur Maghayun, who the sources identify as the Chinese emperor's nephew. a heavy battle occurred. Qutayba managed to defeat the coalition army in combat, driving its commander to retreat, and then led his army back to his base at Merv. He established Arab garrisons and tax administrations in Samarkand and Bukhara and demolished their Zoroastrian fire temples. Both cities developed as future centres of Islamic learning. Umayyad suzerainty was secured over the rest of conquered Transoxiana through tributary alliances with local rulers, whose power remained intact. From 708/709, al-Hajjaj's kinsman Muhammad ibn al-Qasim conquered Sindh in India. The massive war spoils gained by the conquests of Transoxiana, Sind and Hispania were comparable to the amounts accrued in the early Muslim conquests during the reign of Caliph Umar.

Al-Walid I's successor, his brother Sulayman (r. 715–717), continued his predecessors' militarist policies, but expansion mostly ground to a halt during his reign. The deaths of al-Hajjaj in 714 and Qutayba in 715 left the Arab armies in Transoxiana in disarray. For the next 25 years, no further eastward conquests were undertaken and the Arabs lost territory. The Tang Chinese defeated the Arabs at the Battle of Aksu in 717, forcing their withdrawal to Tashkent. Meanwhile, in 716, the governor of Khurasan, Yazid ibn al-Muhallab, attempted to conquer the principalities of Jurjan and Tabaristan along the southern Caspian coast. His Khurasani and Iraqi troops were reinforced by Syrians, marking their first deployment to Khurasan, but the Arabs' initial successes were reversed by the local Iranian coalition of Farrukhan the Great. Afterward, the Arabs withdrew in return for a tributary agreement.

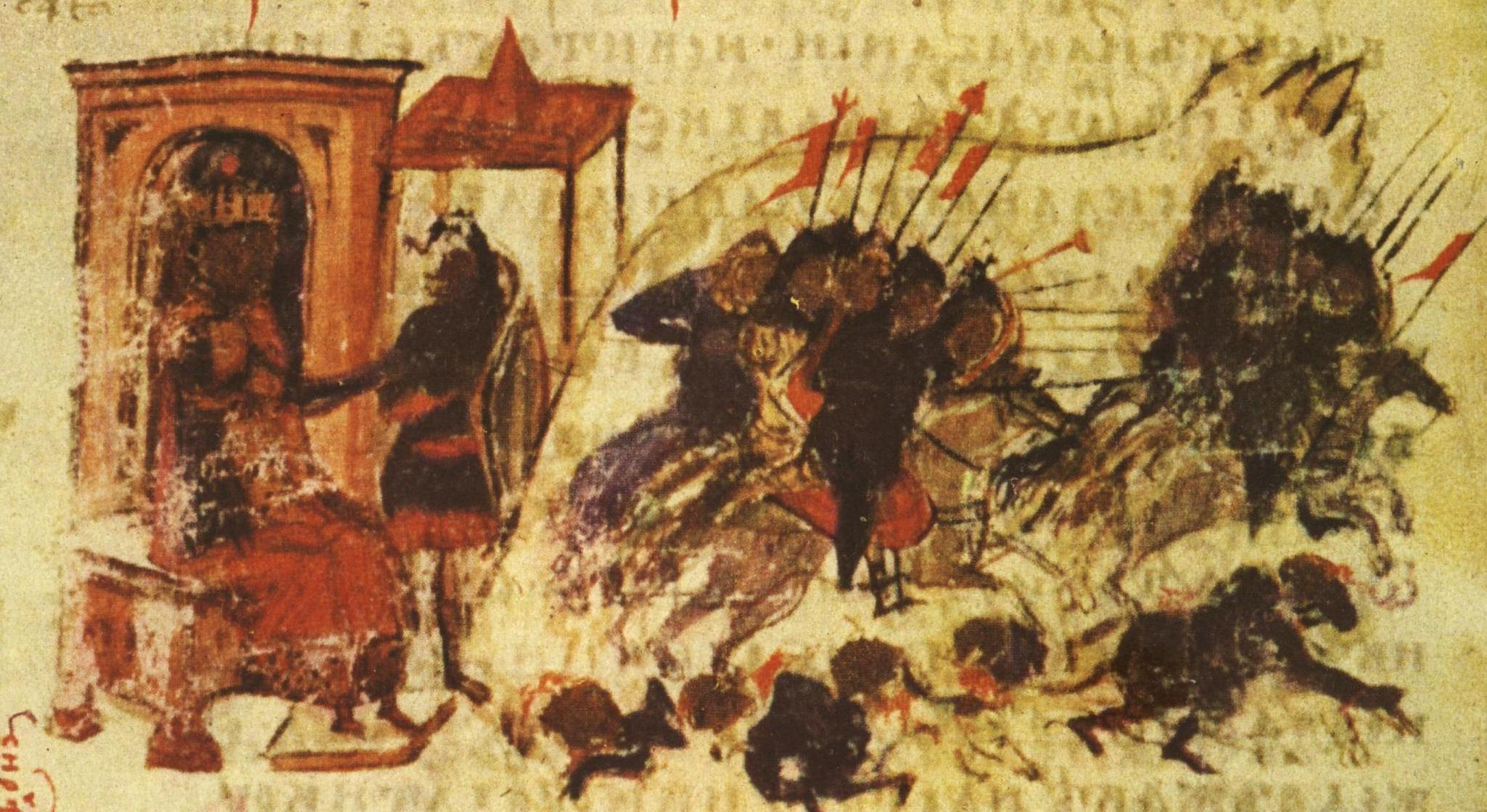
A 14th-century illustration of the siege of Constantinople

On the Byzantine front, Sulayman took up the project to capture Constantinople with increased vigor. His brother Maslama besieged the Byzantine capital from the land, while Umar ibn Hubayra al-Fazari launched a naval campaign against the city. The Byzantines destroyed the Umayyad fleets and defeated Maslama's army, prompting his withdrawal to Syria in 718. The massive losses incurred during the campaign led to a partial retrenchment of Umayyad forces from the captured Byzantine frontier districts, but already in 720, Umayyad raids against Byzantium recommenced. Nevertheless, the goal of conquering Constantinople was effectively abandoned, and the frontier between the two empires stabilized along the line of the Taurus and Anti-Taurus Mountains, over which both sides continued to launch regular raids and counter-raids.

==== Caliphate of Umar ibn Abd al-Aziz ====
Contrary to expectations of a son or brother succeeding him, Sulayman had nominated his cousin, Umar ibn Abd al-Aziz, as his successor and he took office in 717. After the Arabs' severe losses in the offensive against Constantinople, Umar drew down Arab forces on the caliphate's war fronts, though Narbonne in modern France was conquered during his reign. To maintain stronger oversight in the provinces, Umar dismissed all of his predecessors' governors, with his new appointees generally being competent men that he could control. To that end, the massive viceroyalty of Iraq and the east was broken up.

Umar's most significant policy entailed fiscal reforms to equalize the status of the Arabs and mawali, thus remedying a long-standing issue which threatened the Muslim community. The jizya (poll tax) on the mawali was eliminated. Hitherto, the jizya, which was traditionally reserved for the non-Muslim majorities of the caliphate, continued to be imposed on non-Arab converts to Islam, while all Muslims who cultivated conquered lands were liable to pay the kharaj (land tax). Since avoidance of taxation incentivized both mass conversions to Islam and abandonment of land for migration to the garrison cities, it put a strain on tax revenues, especially in Egypt, Iraq and Khurasan. Thus, "the Umayyad rulers had a vested interest in preventing the conquered peoples from accepting Islam or forcing them to continue paying those taxes from which they claimed exemption as Muslims", according to Hawting. To prevent a collapse in revenue, the converts' lands would become the property of their villages and remain liable for the full rate of the kharaj.

In tandem, Umar intensified the Islamization drive of his Marwanid predecessors, enacting measures to distinguish Muslims from non-Muslims and inaugurating Islamic iconoclasm. His position among the Umayyad caliphs is unusual, in that he became the only one to have been recognized in subsequent Islamic tradition as a righteous and legitimate caliph (khalifa) and not merely someone who was a worldly king (malik).

=== Late Marwanid period ===
After the death of Umar II, another son of Abd al-Malik, Yazid II (r. 720–724) became caliph. Not long after his accession, another revolt against Umayyad rule was staged in Iraq, this time by the prominent statesman Yazid ibn al-Muhallab. The latter declared a holy war against the Umayyads, took control of Basra and Wasit and gained the support of the Kufan elite. The caliph's Syrian army defeated the rebels and pursued and nearly eliminated the influential Muhallabids, marking the suppression of the last major Iraqi revolt against the Umayyads.

Yazid II reversed Umar II's egalitarian reforms, reimposing the jizya on the mawali, which sparked revolts in Khurasan in 721 or 722 that persisted for some twenty years and met strong resistance among the Berbers of Ifriqiya, where the Umayyad governor was assassinated by his discontented Berber guards. Warfare on the frontiers was also resumed, with renewed annual raids against the Byzantines and the Khazars in Transcaucasia.

==== Caliphate of Hisham and end of expansion ====
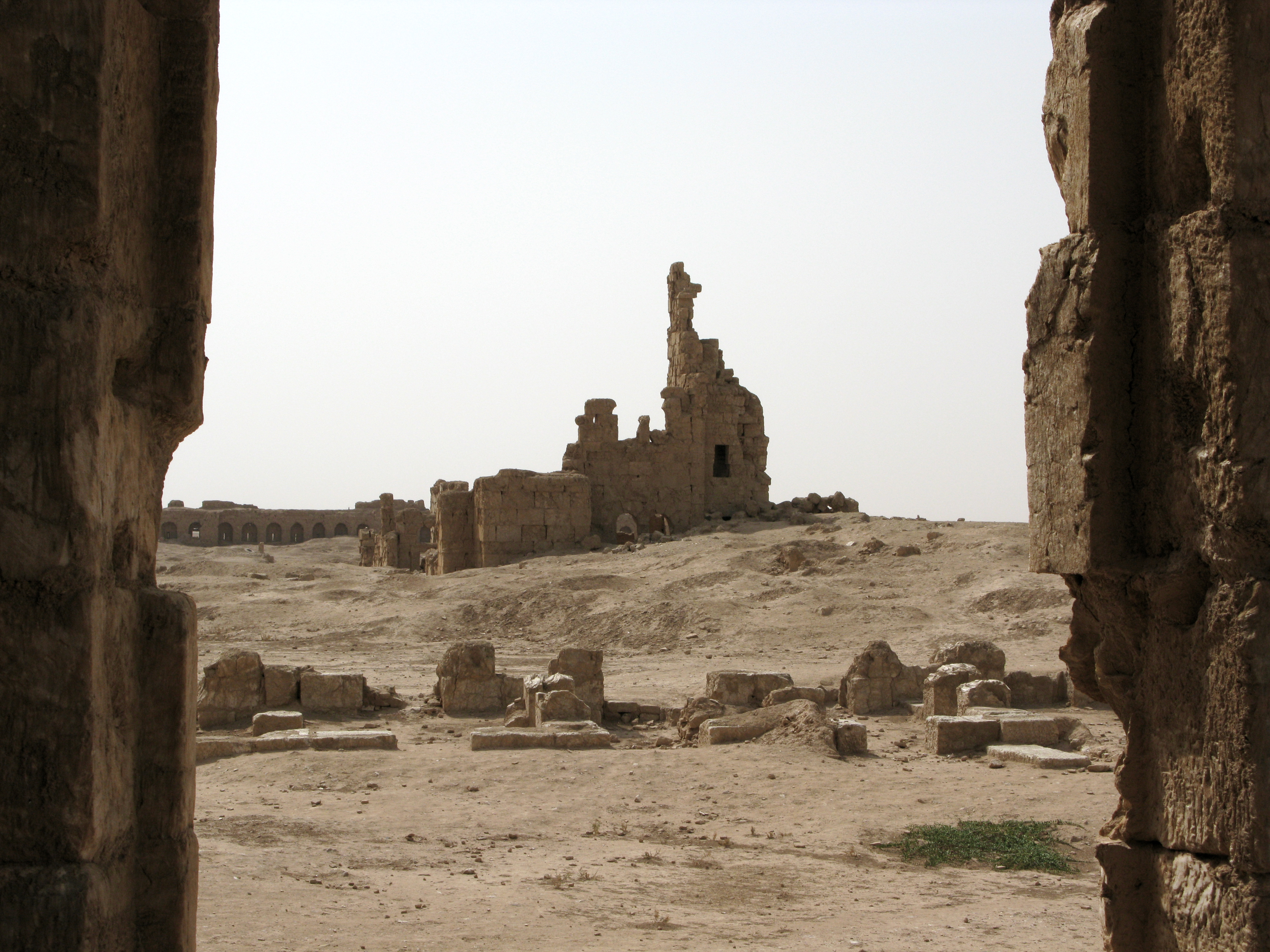
The city of Resafa, site of Hisham's palace and court

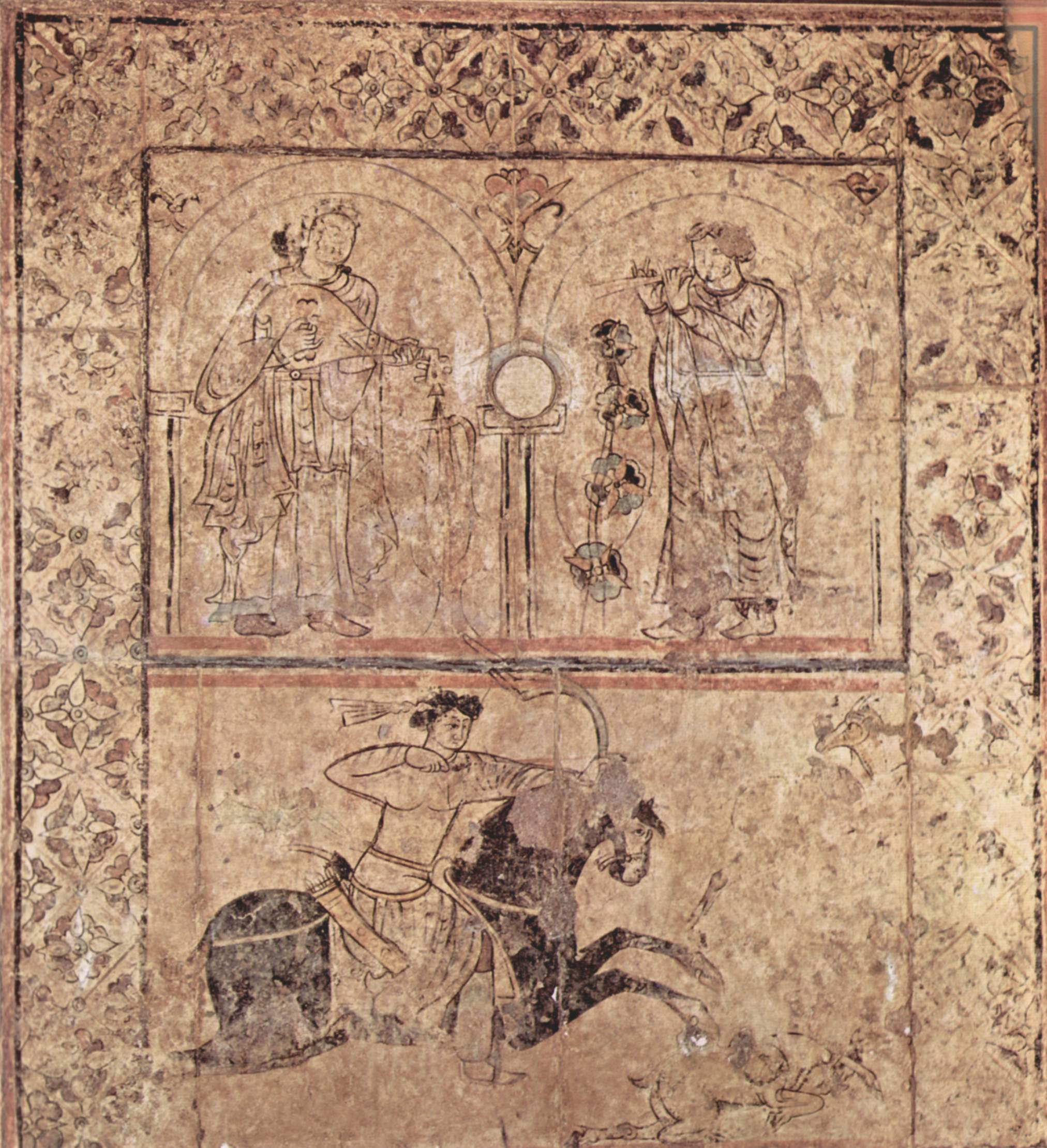
Musicians and hunting cavalier, circa 730 CE. Floor fresco from Hisham's Qasr al-Hayr al-Gharbi, Syria. National Museum, Damascus.

The final son of Abd al-Malik to become caliph was Hisham (r. 724–743), whose long and eventful reign was above all marked by the curtailment of military expansion. Hisham established his court at Resafa in northern Syria, which was closer to the Byzantine border than Damascus, and resumed hostilities against the Byzantines, which had lapsed following the failure of the last siege of Constantinople. The new campaigns resulted in a number of successful raids into Anatolia, but also in a major defeat (the Battle of Akroinon), and did not lead to any significant territorial expansion.

Hisham's reign also witnessed the end of expansion in the west (last stronghold at Narbonne in 759), following the Frankish victory at the Battle of Tours in 732. Arab expansion into southeastern Gaul had already been limited following the Umayyad defeat at the Battle of Toulouse in 721. In 739, a major Berber Revolt broke out in North Africa, which was probably the largest military setback in the reign of Caliph Hisham. From it emerged some of the first Muslim states outside the caliphate. It was followed by the collapse of Umayyad authority in al-Andalus. In India, the Arab armies were defeated by the southern Chalukya dynasty and by the northern Pratihara dynasty, ending further eastwards Arab expansion.

In the Caucasus, the confrontation with the Khazars peaked under Hisham: the Arabs established Derbent as a major military base and launched several invasions of the northern Caucasus, but failed to subdue the nomadic Khazars. The conflict was arduous and bloody, and the Umayyad army suffered a major defeat at the Battle of Marj Ardabil in 730. Marwan ibn Muhammad, the future Marwan II, finally ended the war in 737 with a massive invasion that is reported to have reached as far as the Volga, but the Khazars remained unsubdued.

Hisham suffered still worse defeats in the east, where his armies attempted to subdue both Tokharistan, with its centre at Balkh, and Transoxiana, with its centre at Samarkand. Both areas had already been partially conquered but remained difficult to govern. Once again, a particular difficulty concerned the question of the conversion of non-Arabs, especially the Sogdians of Transoxiana. Following the Umayyad defeat in the "Day of Thirst" in 724, Ashras ibn 'Abd Allah al-Sulami, governor of Khurasan, promised tax relief to those Sogdians who converted to Islam but went back on his offer when it proved too popular and threatened to reduce tax revenues from the province.

Discontent among the Khorasani Arabs rose sharply after the losses suffered in the Battle of the Defile in 731. In 734, al-Harith ibn Surayj led a revolt that received broad backing from Arab settlers and native inhabitants alike, capturing Balkh but failing to take Merv. After this defeat, al-Harith's movement seems to have dissolved. The problem of the rights of non-Arab Muslims would continue to plague the Umayyads to their end.

==== Third Fitna ====
Caliph Hisham was succeeded by al-Walid II (743–744), the son of Yazid II. Al-Walid is reported to have been more interested in earthly pleasures than in religion, a reputation that may be confirmed by the decoration of the so-called "desert palaces" (including Qusayr Amra and Khirbat al-Mafjar) that have been attributed to him. He quickly attracted the enmity of many, by executing a number of those who had opposed his accession.

In 744, Yazid III, a son of al-Walid I, was proclaimed as caliph in Damascus, while his army killed al-Walid II. Yazid III has received a certain reputation for piety and may have been sympathetic to the Qadariyah. He died a mere six months into his reign.

Yazid had appointed his brother, Ibrahim, as his successor, but Marwan II (744–750), the grandson of Marwan I, led an army from the northern frontier and entered Damascus in December 744, where he was proclaimed caliph. Marwan immediately moved the capital north to Harran, in present-day Turkey. A rebellion soon broke out in Syria, perhaps due to resentment over the relocation of the capital, and in 746 Marwan razed the walls of Homs and Damascus in retaliation.

Marwan also faced significant opposition from Kharijites in Iraq and Iran, led by al-Dahhak ibn Qays al-Shaybani as a rival caliph. In 747, Marwan managed to reestablish control of Iraq, but by this time a more serious threat had arisen in Khorasan.

==== Abbasid Revolution and fall ====
The Hashimiyya movement (a sub-sect of the Kaysanites) was led clandestinely by the Abbasid family. The Abbasids were members of Banu Hashim, rivals to the Umayyads, but the word "Hashimiyya" seems to refer specifically to Abu Hashim, a grandson of Ali and son of Muhammad ibn al-Hanafiyya. According to certain traditions, Abu Hashim died in Humayma at the house of Muhammad ibn Ali, the head of the Abbasid family, and before dying named Muhammad ibn Ali as his successor in 717. This tradition allowed the Abbasids to rally the supporters of the failed revolt of Mukhtar al-Thaqafi. Beginning around 719, Hashimiyya missions began to seek adherents in Khurasan. Their campaign was framed as one of proselytism (dawah). They sought support for a "member of the family" of Muhammad, without making explicit mention of the Abbasids. These missions met with success both among Arabs and non-Arab Muslims (mawali), although the latter may have played a particularly important role in the growth of the movement.

Around 746, Abu Muslim assumed leadership of the Hashimiyya in Khurasan. In 747, he successfully initiated an open revolt against Umayyad rule. He soon established control of Khurasan, expelling its Umayyad governor, Nasr ibn Sayyar, and dispatched an army westward. Kufa fell to the Hashimiyya in 749; the last Umayyad stronghold in Iraq, Wasit, was placed under siege, and in November of the same year Abu al-Abbas al-Saffah was recognized as the new caliph in the Great Mosque of Kufa. At this point Marwan mobilized his troops from Harran and advanced toward Iraq. In January 750, the two forces met at the Battle of the Zab, and the Umayyads were defeated. Damascus fell to the Abbasids in April, and in August, Marwan was killed in Egypt. Some Umayyads in Syria continued to resist the takeover. The Umayyad princes Abu Muhammad al-Sufyani, al-Abbas ibn Muhammad, and Hashim ibn Yazid launched revolts in Syria and the Arab–Byzantine frontier around late 750, but they were defeated.

The victors desecrated the tombs of the Umayyads in Syria, sparing only that of Umar II, and most of the Umayyad clan were tracked down and killed. When the Abbasids declared an amnesty for members of the Umayyad family, eighty gathered to receive pardons, and all were massacred. One grandson of Caliph Hisham, Abd al-Rahman I, survived, escaped across North Africa, and established the Emirate of Córdoba in al-Andalus. In a claim unrecognized outside of al-Andalus, he maintained that the Umayyad Caliphate, the true, authentic caliphate, more legitimate than the Abbasids, was continued through him in Córdoba. It was to survive for centuries.

Some Umayyads also survived in Syria, and their descendants would once more attempt to restore their old regime during the Fourth Fitna. Two Umayyads, Abu al-Umaytir al-Sufyani and Maslama ibn Ya'qub, successively seized control of Damascus from 811 to 813, and declared themselves caliphs. However, their rebellions were suppressed.

Previté-Orton argues that the reason for the decline of the Umayyads was the rapid expansion of Islam. During the Umayyad period, mass conversions brought Persians, Berbers, Copts, and Aramaic to Islam. These mawalis (clients) were often better educated and more sophisticated than their Arab overlords. The new converts, on the basis of equality of all Muslims, transformed the political landscape. Previté-Orton also argues that the feud between the Arab tribes of Syria and Iraq further weakened the empire.

== Administration ==
The early Umayyad caliphs created a stable administration for the empire, following the administrative practices and political institutions of the Byzantine Empire which had ruled the same region previously. The Umayyad administration consisted of four main governmental branches: political affairs, military affairs, tax collection, and religious administration. Each of these was further subdivided into more branches, offices, and departments.

=== Provinces ===
Geographically, the empire was divided into several provinces, the borders of which changed numerous times during Umayyad rule. Each province had a governor appointed by the caliph. The governor was in charge of the religious officials, army leaders, police, and civil administrators in his province. Local expenses were paid for by taxes coming from that province, with the remainder each year being sent to the central government in Damascus. As the central power of the Umayyad rulers waned in the later years of the dynasty, some governors neglected to send the extra tax revenue to Damascus and created great personal fortunes.

=== Government workers ===
As the empire grew, the number of qualified Arab workers was too small to keep up with the rapid expansion of the empire. Therefore, Mu'awiya I allowed many of the local government workers in conquered provinces to keep their jobs under the new Umayyad government. Thus, much of the local government's work was recorded in Greek, Coptic, and Persian. It was only during the reign of Caliph Abd al-Malik that government work began to be regularly recorded in Arabic.

=== Military ===
The Umayyad army was mainly Arab, with its core consisting of those who had settled in urban Syria and the Arab tribes who originally served in the army of the Byzantine Empire. These were supported by tribes in the Syrian desert and in the frontier with the Byzantines, as well as Christian tribes. Soldiers were registered with the Army Ministry and were salaried. The army was divided into junds based on regional fortified cities. The Syrian army specialized in close order infantry warfare and favored using a kneeling spear wall formation in battle, likely as a result of their encounters with Roman armies. This was radically different from the original Bedouin style of mobile and individualistic fighting.

There were likely around 300,000 troops enrolled in the registers in 700, though Blankinship gives the larger figure of 400,000 for the reign of Caliph Hisham. Syria - 175,000 (with Damascus alone providing 45,000 troops under al-Walid); Jazira - 75,000; Khurasan - 54,000; Egypt - 40,000; North Africa, Spain and Sind at least 30,000 each, the remaining provinces also garrisoned some troops, though lesser. Before Iraq was demilitarised in wake of the 701 revolt of Ibn al-Ash'ath, it had over 100,000 troops on its Diwan (Basra - 80,000; Kufa - 60,000). Adjusting for the potential unreliability of these reports, a total force of 250,000-300,000 is a reasonable estimate, consistent with the army sizes of the Late Roman and Sasanian empires. Around 40% of this army was based upon the troops of Syria, the Umayyad metropole, which explains how they were able to dominate and maintain control over the other regions, and later establish garrisons of Syrian troops all over the Caliphate.

=== Coinage ===
The Byzantine and Sassanid Empires relied on monetary economies before the Muslim conquest and that system remained in effect during the Umayyad period. Byzantine coinage was used until 658; Byzantine gold coins were still in use until the monetary reforms c. 700. In addition to this, the Umayyad government began to mint its own coins in Damascus, which were initially similar to pre-existing coins but evolved in an independent direction. These were the first coins minted by a Muslim government in history.

Early Islamic coins re-used Byzantine and Sasanian iconography directly but added new Islamic elements. So-called "Arab-Byzantine" coins replicated Byzantine coins and were minted in Levantine cities before and after the Umayyads rose to power. Some examples of these coins, likely minted in Damascus, copied the coins of Byzantine emperor Heraclius, including a depiction of the emperor and his son Heraclius Constantine. On the reverse side, the traditional Byzantine cross-on-steps image was modified to avoid any explicitly non-Islamic connotation.

In the 690s, under Abd al-Malik's reign, a new period of experimentations began. Some Arab-Sasanian coins dated between 692 and 696, associated with the mints in Iraq under governor Bishr ibn Marwan, stopped using the Sasanian image of the fire altar and replaced it with three male figures standing in Arab dress. This was possibly an attempt to depict the act of Muslim prayer or the delivery of the khutba (Friday sermon). Another coin minted probably between 695 and 698 features the image of a spear under an arch. This has been variously interpreted as representing a mihrab or a "sacral arch", the latter being a late antique motif. The spear is believed to be the spear ('anaza) that Muhammad carried before him when entering the mosque.

Between 696 and 699, the caliph introduced a new system of coinage of gold, silver, and bronze. The coins generally featured Arabic inscriptions without any images, ending the earlier iconographic traditions. The main gold unit was the dinar (from Roman denarius), which was worth 20 silver coins. It was most likely modeled on the Byzantine solidus. The silver coin was called a dirham (from Greek drachma). Its size and shape was based on Sasanian coins and they were minted in much larger quantities than in the earlier Byzantine era. The bronze coin was called a fals or fulus (from Byzantine follis).

One group of bronze coins from Palestine, dated after the coinage reform of the late 690s, features the image of a seven-branched menorah and then later of a five-branched menorah, topped by an Arabic inscription of the shahada. These images may have been based on Christian representations of the menorah or on earlier Hasmonean models. The switch to a five-branched version may have been intended to further differentiate this depiction from Jewish and Christian versions.

== Social organization ==
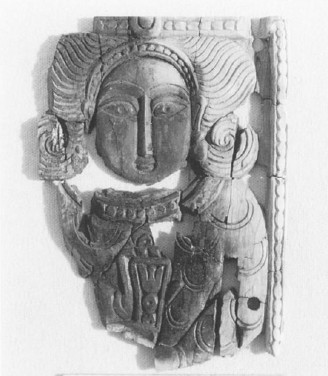
Ivory (circa 8th century) discovered in the Abbasid homestead in Humayma, Jordan. The style indicates an origin in northeastern Iran, the base of Hashimiyya military power.

The Umayyad Caliphate had four main social classes:

1. Arab Muslims
2. Non-Arab Muslims (clients of the Muslim Arabs)
3. Dhimmis (non-Muslim free persons such as Christians, Jews and Zoroastrians)
4. Slaves

Arab Muslims were at the top of the society and saw it as their duty to rule over the conquered areas. They held themselves in higher esteem than non-Arab Muslims with whom they did not generally mix. As Islam spread, more and more of the Muslim population consisted of non-Arabs. This caused social unrest, as the new converts were not given the same rights as Muslim Arabs. As conversions increased, tax revenues from non-Muslims also decreased to dangerous lows. These issues continued to worsen until they helped cause the Abbasid revolution in the 740s.

=== Non-Muslims ===
Non-Muslim groups in the Umayyad Caliphate, which included Christians, Jews and Zoroastrians, were called dhimmis. They were given a legally protected status as second-class citizens as long as they accepted and acknowledged the political supremacy of the ruling Muslims. More specifically, non-Muslims had to pay a tax, known as jizya, which the Muslims did not have to pay; Muslims would instead pay the zakat tax. If non-Muslims converted to Islam, they would cease paying jizya and would instead pay zakat.

Although the Umayyads were harsh when it came to defeating their Zoroastrian adversaries, they did offer protection and relative religious tolerance to the Zoroastrians who accepted their authority. Umar ibn Abd al-Aziz was reported to have said in one of his letters commanding not to "destroy a synagogue or a church or temple of fire worshippers (meaning the Zoroastrians) as long as they have reconciled with and agreed upon with the Muslims". Fred Donner says that Zoroastrians in the northern parts of Iran were hardly penetrated by the "believers", winning virtually complete autonomy in-return for tribute-tax or jizya. Donner adds that "Zoroastrians continued to exist in large numbers in northern and western Iran and elsewhere for centuries after the rise of Islam, and indeed, much of the canon of Zoroastrian religious texts was elaborated and written down during the Islamic period."

Christians and Jews still continued to produce great theological thinkers within their communities, but as time wore on, many of the intellectuals converted to Islam, leading to a lack of great thinkers in the non-Muslim communities. Important Christian writers from the Umayyad period include the theologian John of Damascus, bishop Cosmas of Maiuma, Pope Benjamin I of Alexandria and Isaac of Nineveh. Christians were also employed in many bureaucratic positions within the Umayyad government, with Sarjun ibn Mansur being an important example. The son of a prominent Byzantine Melkite Christian official of Damascus, he was favoured by the early Umayyad caliphs, Mu'awiya I and Yazid I, and served as the head of Syria's fiscal administration from the mid-7th century until the year 700, when Caliph Abd al-Malik dismissed him as part of his efforts to Arabicize the bureaucracy of the caliphate. According to the Muslim historians al-Baladhuri and al-Tabari, Sarjun was a mawla of the first Umayyad caliph, Mu'awiya I (r. 661–680), (Note: Mu'awiya I was generally favourably disposed towards Christians and, according to al-Ya'qubi, the first Muslim caliph to employ Christians in administrative positions.) serving as his "secretary and the person in charge of his business". The hagiographies, although less reliable, also assign to him a role in the administration, even as "ruler" (archon or even amir), of Damascus and its environs, where he was responsible for collecting the revenue. In this capacity, he is attested in later collections of source material such as that of al-Mas'udi. Sarjun ibn Mansur was replaced by Sulayman ibn Sa'd al-Khushani, another Christian.

Mu'awiya's marriage to Maysun bint Bahdal (Yazid's mother) was politically motivated, as she was the daughter of the chief of the Banu Kalb, which was a large Arab tribe in Syria. The Kalb tribe had remained largely neutral when the Muslims first went into Syria. After the plague that killed much of the Muslim armies in Syria, by marrying Maysun, Mu'awiya used the Syriac Christians against the Byzantines. Tom Holland writes that Christians, Jews, Samaritans and Manichaeans were all treated well by Mu'awiya. Mu'awiya even restored Edessa's cathedral after it had been toppled by an earthquake. Holland also writes that, "Savagely though Mu'awiya prosecuted his wars against the Romans, yet his subjects, no longer trampled by rival armies, no longer divided by hostile watchtowers, knew only peace at last. Justice flourished in his time, and there was great peace in the regions under his control. He allowed everyone to live as they wanted."

== Architecture ==
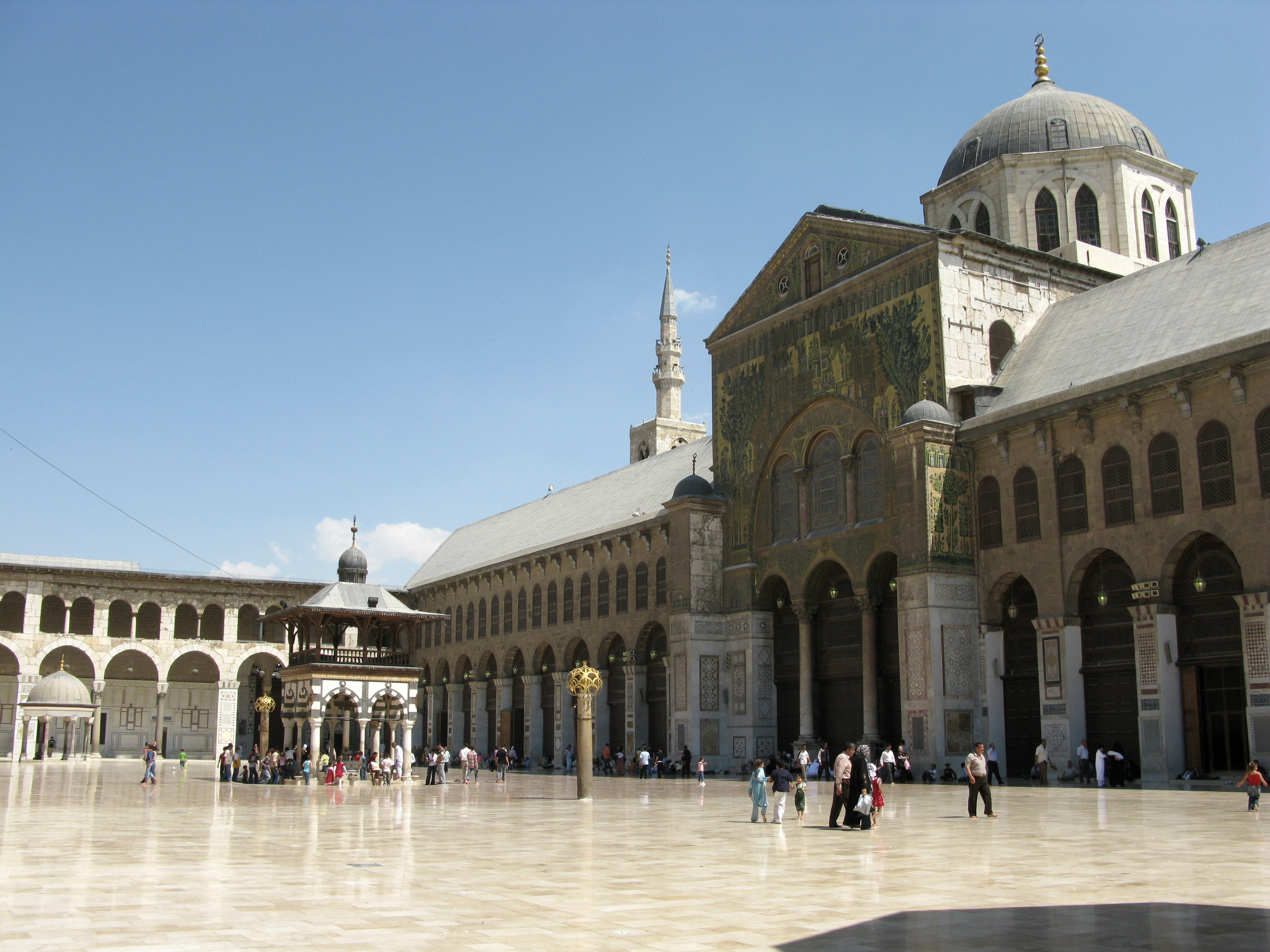
The Umayyad Mosque in Damascus was constructed on the orders of Al-Walid I, begun c. 705 and completed shortly after his death in 715.

The Umayyads constructed grand congregational mosques and palaces within their empire. Most of their surviving monuments are located in their metropolitan province of Syria. They also continued the existing Muslim policy of building new garrison cities (amsar) in their provinces that served as bases for further expansion. Their most famous constructions include the Dome of the Rock in Jerusalem and the Great Mosque of Damascus. They also renovated and expanded the Masjid al-Haram in Mecca, and reconstructed the Prophet's Mosque in Medina and Al-Aqsa Mosque in Jerusalem. Other prominent constructions include the desert palaces, such as Khirbat al-Mafjar and Qusayr 'Amra. Among these projects, the construction of the Great Mosque in Damascus reflected the diversity of the empire, as Greek, Persian, Coptic (Egyptian), Indian and Maghrebi craftsmen were recruited to build it.

Under Umayyad patronage, Islamic architecture was derived from established Byzantine and Sasanian architectural traditions, but it also innovated by combining elements of these styles together, experimenting with new building types, and implementing lavish decorative programs. Byzantine-style mosaics are prominently featured in both the Dome of the Rock and the Great Mosque of Damascus, but the lack of human figures in their imagery was a new trait that demonstrates an Islamic taboo on figural representation in religious art. Palaces were decorated with floor mosaics, frescoes, and relief carving, and some of these included representations of human figures and animals. Umayyad architecture was thus an important transitional period during which early Islamic architecture and visual culture began to develop its own distinct identity.

The later offshoot of the Umayyad dynasty in al-Andalus, which ruled the Emirate and subsequent Caliphate of Córdoba, also undertook major architectural projects in the Iberian Peninsula such as the Great Mosque of Córdoba and Madinat al-Zahra, which influenced later architecture in the western Islamic world.

== Legacy ==
Map of the caliphate's expansion Expansion under Muhammad, 622–632 Expansion during the Rashidun Caliphate, 632–661 Expansion during the Umayyad Caliphate, 661–750

The Umayyad Caliphate was marked both by territorial expansion and by the administrative and cultural problems that such expansion created. Despite some notable exceptions, the Umayyads tended to favor the rights of the old Arab elite families, and in particular their own, over those of newly converted Muslims (mawali). Therefore, they held to a less universalist conception of Islam than did many of their rivals. As G.R. Hawting has written, "Islam was in fact regarded as the property of the conquering aristocracy."

During the period of the Umayyads, Arabic became the administrative language and the process of Arabization was initiated in the Levant, Mesopotamia, North Africa, and Hispania. State documents and currency were issued in Arabic. Conversions to Islam also created a growing population of Muslims in the territory of the caliphate.

According to one common view, the Umayyads transformed the caliphate from a religious institution (during the Rashidun Caliphate) to a dynastic one. However, the Umayyad caliphs do seem to have understood themselves as the representatives of God on earth, and to have been responsible for the "definition and elaboration of God's ordinances, or in other words the definition or elaboration of Islamic law."

The Umayyads have met with a largely negative reception from later Islamic historians, who have accused them of promoting a kingship (mulk, a term with connotations of tyranny) instead of a true caliphate (khilafa). In this respect it is notable that the Umayyad caliphs referred to themselves not as khalifat Rasul Allah ("successor of the Messenger of God", the title preferred by the tradition), but rather as khalifat Allah ("deputy of God"). The distinction seems to indicate that the Umayyads "regarded themselves as God's representatives at the head of the community and saw no need to share their religious power with, or delegate it to, the emergent class of religious scholars."

Even the earliest pro-Shia accounts of al-Masudi, offer a relatively balanced portrayal of Mu'awiya, recounting that he spent a great deal of time in prayer, in spite of the burden of managing a large empire. After killing off most of the Umayyads and destroying their graves (apart from that of Umar ibn Abd al-Aziz), the history books written during the later Abbasid period are more anti-Umayyad.

Modern Arab nationalism regards the Umayyad period as part of the Arab Golden Age. This is particularly true of Syrian nationalists, with the present-day state of Syria centred like that of the Umayyads in Damascus. The Umayyad banners were white, after the banner of Mu'awiya ibn Abi Sufyan; it is now one of the four pan-Arab colors which appear in various combinations on the flags of most Arab countries.

=== Religious perspectives ===
==== Sunnis ====
The Umayyads were criticized for having too many non-Muslim, former Roman administrators in their government. As the Muslims took over Byzantine cities, they left the Roman tax collectors and administrators in office. The taxes to the central government were calculated by political representatives, and local governments were compensated for their services. Many Christian cities used some of the tax revenue to maintain their churches and run their own organizations. Later, the Umayyads were criticized by many Muslims for not reducing the taxes of the people who converted to Islam.

The only Umayyad ruler who is unanimously praised by Sunni sources for his devout piety and justice is Caliph Umar II. In his efforts to spread Islam, he abolished the jizya tax for non-Arab Muslim converts, although it reduced the government's revenues. Umar ibn Abd al-Aziz also stopped the personal allowances provided to his relatives, stating that he could only give them an allowance if he gave an allowance to everyone else in the empire. After his death in 720, his policies were largely reversed, resulting in rebellions.

==== Shi'as ====
The negative view of the Umayyads is briefly expressed in the Shi'a book "Sulh al-Hasan". According to Shia hadiths, Ali described them as the worst Fitna. Shia sources widely describe the Umayyad Caliphate as "tyrannical, anti-Islamic and godless", condemning Mu'awiya for clashing with Ali at the Battle of Siffin and for declaring his son Yazid, whose forces would kill Husayn ibn Ali at the Battle of Karbala, as his successor.

==== Bahais ====
Asked for an explanation of the prophecies in the Book of Revelation (12:3), `Abdu'l-Bahá suggests in Some Answered Questions that the "great red dragon, having seven heads and ten horns, and seven crowns upon his heads", refers to the Umayyad caliphs who "rose against the religion of Prophet Muhammad and against the reality of Ali".

The seven heads of the dragon are symbolic of the seven provinces of the lands dominated by the Umayyads: Damascus, Persia, Arabia, Egypt, Africa, Andalusia, and Transoxiana. The ten horns represent the ten names of Umayyad leaders: Abu Sufyan, Mu'awiya, Yazid, Marwan, Abd al-Malik, al-Walid, Sulayman, Umar, Hisham, and Ibrahim. Some names were re-used, as in the case of Yazid II and Yazid III, which were not accounted for in this interpretation.

== See also ==
- History of Islam
- History of the Arabs
- List of Sunni dynasties

== Bibliography ==
- Blankinship, Khalid Yahya (1994). The End of the Jihâd State: The Reign of Hishām ibn ʻAbd al-Malik and the Collapse of the Umayyads. Albany, New York: State University of New York Press. ISBN 978-0-7914-1827-7.
- Beckwith, Christopher I. (1993). The Tibetan Empire in Central Asia: A History of the Struggle for Great Power Among Tibetans, Turks, Arabs, and Chinese During the Early Middle Ages. Princeton University Press. ISBN 978-0-691-02469-1.
- Bosworth, C.E. (1993). "Muʿāwiya II". In Bosworth, C. E.; van Donzel, E.; Heinrichs, W. P. & Pellat, Ch. (eds.). The Encyclopaedia of Islam, Second Edition. Volume VII: Mif–Naz. Leiden: E. J. Brill. pp. 268–269. ISBN 978-90-04-09419-2.
- Christides, Vassilios (2000). "ʿUkba b. Nāfiʿ". In Bearman, P. J.; Bianquis, Th.; Bosworth, C. E.; van Donzel, E. & Heinrichs, W. P. (eds.). The Encyclopaedia of Islam, Second Edition. Volume X: T–U. Leiden: E. J. Brill. pp. 789–790. ISBN 978-90-04-11211-7.
- Crone, Patricia; Hinds, Martin (1986). God's Caliph: Religious Authority in the First Centuries of Islam. Cambridge: Cambridge University Press. ISBN 0-521-32185-9.
- Crone, Patricia (1994). "Were the Qays and Yemen of the Umayyad Period Political Parties?". Der Islam. 71 (1). Walter de Gruyter and Co.: 1–57. doi:10.1515/islm.1994.71.1.1. ISSN 0021-1818. S2CID 154370527.
- Cobb, P. M. (2000). "ʿUmar (II) b. ʿAbd al-ʿAzīz". In Bearman, P. J.; Bianquis, Th.; Bosworth, C. E.; van Donzel, E. & Heinrichs, W. P. (eds.). The Encyclopaedia of Islam, Second Edition. Volume X: T–U. Leiden: E. J. Brill. pp. 821–822. ISBN 978-90-04-11211-7.
- Cobb, Paul M. (2001). White Banners: Contention in 'Abbasid Syria, 750–880. SUNY Press. ISBN 978-0791448809.
- Dietrich, Albert (1971). "Al-Ḥadjdjādj b. Yūsuf". In Lewis, B.; Ménage, V. L.; Pellat, Ch. & Schacht, J. (eds.). The Encyclopaedia of Islam, Second Edition. Volume III: H–Iram. Leiden: E. J. Brill. pp. 39–43. OCLC 495469525.
- Donner, Fred M. (1981). The Early Islamic Conquests. Princeton: Princeton University Press. ISBN 978-1-4008-4787-7.
- Duri, Abd al-Aziz (1965). "Dīwān". In Lewis, B.; Pellat, Ch. & Schacht, J. (eds.). The Encyclopaedia of Islam, Second Edition. Volume II: C–G. Leiden: E. J. Brill. pp. 323–327. OCLC 495469475.
- Duri, Abd al-Aziz (2011). Early Islamic Institutions: Administration and Taxation from the Caliphate to the Umayyads and ʿAbbāsids. Translated by Razia Ali. London and Beirut: I. B. Tauris and Centre for Arab Unity Studies. ISBN 978-1-84885-060-6.
- Dixon, 'Abd al-Ameer (August 1969). The Umayyad Caliphate, 65–86/684–705: (A Political Study) (Thesis). London: University of London, SOAS.
- Eisener, R. (1997). "Sulaymān b. ʿAbd al-Malik". In Bosworth, C. E.; van Donzel, E.; Heinrichs, W. P. & Lecomte, G. (eds.). The Encyclopaedia of Islam, Second Edition. Volume IX: San–Sze. Leiden: E. J. Brill. pp. 821–822. ISBN 978-90-04-10422-8.
- Elad, Amikam (1999). Medieval Jerusalem and Islamic Worship: Holy Places, Ceremonies, Pilgrimage (2nd ed.). Leiden: Brill. ISBN 90-04-10010-5.
- Elisséeff, Nikita (1965). "Dimashk". In Lewis, B.; Pellat, Ch. & Schacht, J. (eds.). The Encyclopaedia of Islam, Second Edition. Volume II: C–G. Leiden: E. J. Brill. pp. 277–291. OCLC 495469475.
- Flood, Finbarr Barry (2001). The Great Mosque of Damascus: Studies on the Makings of an Umayyad Visual Culture. Boston: Brill. ISBN 90-04-11638-9.
- Gibb, H. A. R. (1923). The Arab Conquests in Central Asia. London: The Royal Asiatic Society.
- Gibb, H. A. R. (1960). "ʿAbd Allāh ibn al-Zubayr". In Gibb, H. A. R.; Kramers, J. H.; Lévi-Provençal, E.; Schacht, J.; Lewis, B. & Pellat, Ch. (eds.). The Encyclopaedia of Islam, Second Edition. Volume I: A–B. Leiden: E. J. Brill. pp. 54–55. OCLC 495469456.
- Gibb, H. A. R. (1960). "ʿAbd al-Malik b. Marwān". In Gibb, H. A. R.; Kramers, J. H.; Lévi-Provençal, E.; Schacht, J.; Lewis, B. & Pellat, Ch. (eds.). The Encyclopaedia of Islam, Second Edition. Volume I: A–B. Leiden: E. J. Brill. pp. 76–77. OCLC 495469456.
- Gilbert, Victoria J. (May 2013). Syria for the Syrians: the rise of Syrian nationalism, 1970–2013 (PDF) (MA). Northeastern University. doi:10.17760/d20004883.
- Grabar, O. (1986). "Kubbat al-Ṣakhra". In Bosworth, C. E.; van Donzel, E.; Lewis, B. & Pellat, Ch. (eds.). The Encyclopaedia of Islam, Second Edition. Volume V: Khe–Mahi. Leiden: E. J. Brill. pp. 298–299. ISBN 978-90-04-07819-2.
- Griffith, Sidney H. (2016). "The Manṣūr Family and Saint John of Damascus: Christians and Muslims in Umayyad Times". In Antoine Borrut; Fred M. Donner (eds.). Christians and Others in the Umayyad State. Chicago: The Oriental Institute of the University of Chicago. pp. 29–51. ISBN 978-1-614910-31-2.
- Hathaway, Jane (2012). A Tale of Two Factions: Myth, Memory, and Identity in Ottoman Egypt and Yemen. SUNY Press. ISBN 978-0-7914-8610-8.
- Hawting, Gerald R. (2000). The First Dynasty of Islam: The Umayyad Caliphate AD 661–750 (Second ed.). London and New York: Routledge. ISBN 0-415-24072-7.
- Hawting, G. R. (2000). "Umayyads". In Bearman, P. J.; Bianquis, Th.; Bosworth, C. E.; van Donzel, E. & Heinrichs, W. P. (eds.). The Encyclopaedia of Islam, Second Edition. Volume X: T–U. Leiden: E. J. Brill. pp. 840–847. ISBN 978-90-04-11211-7.
- Hillenbrand, Carole, ed. (1989). The History of al-Ṭabarī, Volume XXVI: The Waning of the Umayyad Caliphate: Prelude to Revolution, A.D. 738–744/A.H. 121–126. SUNY Series in Near Eastern Studies. Albany, New York: State University of New York Press. ISBN 978-0-88706-810-2.
- Hillenbrand, Robert (1994). Islamic Architecture: Form, Function and Meaning. New York: Columbia University Press. ISBN 0-231-10132-5.
- Hinds, M. (1993). "Muʿāwiya I b. Abī Sufyān". In Bosworth, C. E.; van Donzel, E.; Heinrichs, W. P. & Pellat, Ch. (eds.). The Encyclopaedia of Islam, Second Edition. Volume VII: Mif–Naz. Leiden: E. J. Brill. pp. 263–268. ISBN 978-90-04-09419-2.
- Holland, Tom (2013). In the Shadow of the Sword The Battle for Global Empire and the End of the Ancient World. Abacus. ISBN 978-0-349-12235-9.
- Johns, Jeremy (January 2003). "Archaeology and the History of Early Islam: The First Seventy Years". Journal of the Economic and Social History of the Orient. 46 (4): 411–436. doi:10.1163/156852003772914848. S2CID 163096950.
- Kaegi, Walter E. (1992). Byzantium and the Early Islamic Conquests. Cambridge: Cambridge University Press. ISBN 0-521-41172-6.
- Kaegi, Walter E. (2010). Muslim Expansion and Byzantine Collapse in North Africa. Cambridge: Cambridge University Press. ISBN 978-0-521-19677-2.
- Kennedy, Hugh (2001). The Armies of the Caliphs: Military and Society in the Early Islamic State. London and New York: Routledge. ISBN 0-415-25093-5.
- Kennedy, Hugh N. (2002). "Al-Walīd (I)". In Bearman, P. J.; Bianquis, Th.; Bosworth, C. E.; van Donzel, E. & Heinrichs, W. P. (eds.). The Encyclopaedia of Islam, Second Edition. Volume XI: W–Z. Leiden: E. J. Brill. pp. 127–128. ISBN 978-90-04-12756-2.
- Kennedy, Hugh N. (2004). The Prophet and the Age of the Caliphates: The Islamic Near East from the 6th to the 11th Century (2nd ed.). Harlow: Longman. ISBN 978-0-582-40525-7.
- Kennedy, Hugh (2007). The Great Arab Conquests: How the Spread of Islam Changed the World We Live In. Philadelphia, Pennsylvania: Da Capo Press. ISBN 978-0-306-81740-3.
  - Kennedy, Hugh (2007a). "1. The Foundations of Conquest". The Great Arab Conquests: How the Spread of Islam Changed the World We Live In. Hachette, UK. ISBN 978-0-306-81728-1.
- Lammens, H. & Blankinship, Kh. Y. (2002). "Yazīd (II) b. ʿAbd al-Malik". In Bearman, P. J.; Bianquis, Th.; Bosworth, C. E.; van Donzel, E. & Heinrichs, W. P. (eds.). The Encyclopaedia of Islam, Second Edition. Volume XI: W–Z. Leiden: E. J. Brill. p. 311. ISBN 978-90-04-12756-2.
- Lapidus, Ira M. (2014). A History of Islamic Societies. Cambridge University Press. ISBN 978-0-521-51430-9.
- Kennedy, Hugh (2016) [1986]. The Prophet and the Age of the Caliphates: The Islamic Near East from the 6th to the 11th Century (Third ed.). Abingdon, Oxon and New York: Routledge. ISBN 978-1-138-78761-2.
- Levi Della Vida, Giorgio & Bosworth, C. E. (2000). "Umayya b. Abd Shams". In Bearman, P. J.; Bianquis, Th.; Bosworth, C. E.; van Donzel, E. & Heinrichs, W. P. (eds.). The Encyclopaedia of Islam, Second Edition. Volume X: T–U. Leiden: E. J. Brill. pp. 837–839. ISBN 978-90-04-11211-7.
- Lévi-Provençal, E. (1993). "Mūsā b. Nuṣayr". In Bosworth, C. E.; van Donzel, E.; Heinrichs, W. P. & Pellat, Ch. (eds.). The Encyclopaedia of Islam, Second Edition. Volume VII: Mif–Naz. Leiden: E. J. Brill. pp. 643–644. ISBN 978-90-04-09419-2.
- Lilie, Ralph-Johannes (1976). Die byzantinische Reaktion auf die Ausbreitung der Araber. Studien zur Strukturwandlung des byzantinischen Staates im 7. und 8. Jhd (in German). Munich: Institut für Byzantinistik und Neugriechische Philologie der Universität München. OCLC 797598069.
- Madelung, W. (1975). "The Minor Dynasties of Northern Iran". In Frye, Richard N. (ed.). The Cambridge History of Iran: From the Arab Invasion to the Saljuqs. Vol. 4. Cambridge: Cambridge University Press. pp. 198–249. ISBN 0-521-20093-8.
- Madelung, Wilferd (1993). "DABUYIDS". In Yarshater, Ehsan (ed.). Encyclopædia Iranica. Vol. VI/5: Čūb-bāzī–Daf(f) and Dāyera. London and New York: Routledge & Kegan Paul. pp. 541–544. ISBN 978-1-56859-003-5.
- Madelung, Wilferd (1997). The Succession to Muhammad: A Study of the Early Caliphate. Cambridge: Cambridge University Press. ISBN 0-521-56181-7.
- Morony, Michael G., ed. (1987). The History of al-Ṭabarī, Volume XVIII: Between Civil Wars: The Caliphate of Muʿāwiyah, 661–680 A.D./A.H. 40–60. SUNY Series in Near Eastern Studies. Albany, New York: State University of New York Press. ISBN 978-0-87395-933-9.
- Talbi, M. (1971). "Ḥassān b. al-Nuʿmān al-Ghassānī". In Lewis, B.; Ménage, V. L.; Pellat, Ch. & Schacht, J. (eds.). The Encyclopaedia of Islam, Second Edition. Volume III: H–Iram. Leiden: E. J. Brill. p. 271. OCLC 495469525.
- Ochsenwald, William (2004). The Middle East, A History. McGraw Hill. ISBN 978-0-07-244233-5.
- Powers, David S., ed. (1989). The History of al-Ṭabarī, Volume XXIV: The Empire in Transition: The Caliphates of Sulaymān, ʿUmar, and Yazīd, A.D. 715–724/A.H. 96–105. SUNY Series in Near Eastern Studies. Albany, New York: State University of New York Press. ISBN 978-0-7914-0072-2.
- Previté-Orton, C. W. (1971). The Shorter Cambridge Medieval History. Cambridge: Cambridge University Press.
- Rahman, H.U. (1999). A Chronology Of Islamic History 570–1000 CE.
- Sanchez, Fernando Lopez (2015). "The Mining, Minting, and Acquisition of Gold in the Roman and Post-Roman World". In Paul Erdkamp; Koenraad Verboven; Arjan Zuiderhoek (eds.). Ownership and Exploitation of Land and Natural Resources in the Roman World. Oxford University Press. ISBN 9780191795831.
- Sprengling, Martin (April 1939). "From Persian to Arabic". The American Journal of Semitic Languages and Literatures. 56 (2). The University of Chicago Press: 175–224. doi:10.1086/370538. JSTOR 528934. S2CID 170486943.
- Ter-Ghewondyan, Aram (1976) [1965]. The Arab Emirates in Bagratid Armenia. Translated by Garsoïan, Nina. Lisbon: Livraria Bertrand.
- Treadgold, Warren (1997). A History of the Byzantine State and Society. Stanford, California: Stanford University Press. ISBN 0-8047-2630-2.
- Wellhausen, Julius (1927). The Arab Kingdom and Its Fall. Translated by Margaret Graham Weir. Calcutta: University of Calcutta.
- Muir, William (1891). The Caliphate: Its Rise, Decline, and Fall. Religious Tract Society.
- al-Sallabi, Ali (2008). الدولة الأموية عوامل الإزدهار وتداعيات الإنهيار [The Umayyad State: Factors of Prosperity and Consequences of Collapse] (in Arabic). Dar Al-Marefah. ISBN 978-9953850030.
