= Al-Walid ibn Utba ibn Abi Sufyan =

Governor of Medina (677/78–680) and (681–682)

Walid ibn Utba
- وليد بن عتبة

Governor of Medina
- In office 677/78–680
- Monarch: Mu'awiya I
- Preceded by: Marwan I
- Succeeded by: Al-Ashdaq
- In office 681–682
- Monarch: Yazid I
- Preceded by: Al-Ashdaq
- Succeeded by: Uthman ibn Muhammad ibn Abi Sufyan

Personal details
- Born: Mecca
- Died: 684
- Relations: Banu Umayya (clan)
- Parent: Utba ibn Abi Sufyan

Al-Walid ibn Utba ibn Abi Sufyan (Arabic: وليد بن عتبة, romanized: Al-Walīd ibn ʿUtba) (died 684) was a statesman and member of the Umayyad ruling family during the reigns of the Umayyad caliphs Mu'awiya I (r. 661–680) and Yazid I (r. 680–683). He served two stints as the governor of Medina in 677/78–680 and 681–682. He was dismissed during his first term for failing to secure oaths of allegiance from Husayn ibn Ali and other senior Muslim figures who opposed Yazid's accession. After his relocation to Damascus during the Second Fitna, he was imprisoned in 684 for proclaiming his support for continued Umayyad rule and condemning the anti-Umayyad caliph Abd Allah ibn al-Zubayr. He was freed shortly after by his kinsman Khalid ibn Yazid and the pro-Umayyad Banu Kalb tribe.

== Governor of Medina ==
Al-Walid ibn Utba belonged to the Umayyad clan and was a son of Utba ibn Abi Sufyan and thus a paternal nephew of Caliph Mu'awiya I (r. 661–680), founder of the Umayyad Caliphate centered in Syria. He may have led the annual Hajj pilgrimage to Mecca in October 676. According to the early Muslim historian al-Waqidi (died 823), Mu'awiya appointed al-Walid governor of Medina in September/October 677, while according to another 8th-century historian Abu Mash'ar, he was appointed in August/September 678. He replaced his Umayyad cousin, Marwan ibn al-Hakam. He led the Hajj again in September 678. According to the accounts of the early Muslim historian al-Baladhuri (died 892), al-Walid had a reputation for drinking and was involved in intra-dynastic disputes over power in the caliphate from the beginning of his career.

Mu'awiya nominated his own son, Yazid I, as successor in a move unprecedented in Islamic history. When Yazid acceded in 680, he charged al-Walid with securing the oaths of allegiance to him from al-Husayn ibn Ali, Abd Allah ibn al-Zubayr and Abd Allah ibn Umar, all of whom had earlier refused to recognize Mu'awiya's nomination of Yazid. Accordingly, al-Walid invited Husayn and Ibn al-Zubayr to the governor's palace in Medina, which aroused both of their suspicions; Ibn al-Zubayr fled to Mecca, while Husayn agreed to meet al-Walid accompanied by his retinue of clansmen and mawali (non-Arab clients or freedmen). Al-Walid informed Husayn of Mu'awiya's death and demanded the oath of allegiance to Yazid. Husayn suggested his recognition of Yazid, to be legitimate, should be made in public, to which al-Walid agreed. Instead, al-Husayn managed to delay his public recognition for two days, allowing him to escape to Mecca. Marwan ibn al-Hakam pressed al-Walid to respond with force, but al-Walid was not willing to take violent measures against Husayn as he was a grandson of the Islamic prophet Muhammad. Meanwhile, al-Walid had sent horsemen to pursue Ibn al-Zubayr, but they were unable to reach him. Al-Walid's lax approach led to his dismissal by Yazid in June 680 and replacement by another Umayyad, Amr ibn Sa'id ibn al-As.

Al-Walid was reappointed governor of Medina at the beginning of the Hajj on 21 August 681. He led the Hajj that year and the next year, in August 682. Al-Walid was unsuccessful in his efforts to subdue Ibn al-Zubayr, who had launched a revolt against the Umayyads from his base in Mecca. While al-Walid led the Hajj on behalf of the Umayyad authorities in 682, Ibn al-Zubayr led his own followers, as did the Kharijite leader Najda ibn 'Amir al-Hanafi. According to the accounts recorded in the history of al-Tabari, in an apparent ploy, Ibn al-Zubayr subsequently sent a letter to Yazid in which he referred to al-Walid as a "stupid man who does not direct us to a straightforward situation" and suggested he should appoint a more amiable governor that Ibn al-Zubayr would in turn cooperate with. Yazid agreed and appointed al-Walid's cousin Uthman ibn Muhammad ibn Abi Sufyan in his place as governor.

== Sufyanid succession crisis ==
The Umayyads of the Hejaz, where Mecca and Medina are located, were expelled and relocated to Syria as the rebellion against Umayyad rule escalated. The successive deaths of Yazid and his son and successor, Caliph Mu'awiya II, in 683 and 684 left a leadership void in Syria and precipitated the collapse of Umayyad authority throughout the caliphate. Al-Walid had led the funeral prayers for Mu'awiya II. The Umayyads' governor in Damascus, al-Dahhak ibn Qays al-Fihri, secretly supported Ibn al-Zubayr's suzerainty, but withheld openly recognizing him due to the strong presence of the Umayyads and their supporters in the city and vicinity of Damascus. Ibn Bahdal, a leader of the pro-Umayyad Banu Kalb tribe, sent a letter condemning Ibn al-Zubayr and proclaiming support for continued Umayyad rule with one of his tribesmen, a certain Naghida or Na'isa, for al-Dahhak to read during the Friday prayers. When al-Dahhak refused to publicly read the letter, Naghida read it aloud, for which he was censured by al-Dahhak. Al-Walid then openly declared his support for Naghida's statement and was followed by members of the Banu Kalb and the Ghassanids who were in attendance. Al-Walid was imprisoned by al-Dahhak, but freed by Yazid's sons Khalid and Abd Allah and their maternal kinsmen from the Banu Kalb. The eldest surviving Sufyanid, al-Walid may have intended to claim the mantle of succession, but died, possibly of plague, in 684.

Sufyanid family tree

Caliph Uthman (r. 644–656)	Abu Sufyan	Prophet Muhammad
Amr	Hanzala	Yazid	Amr	Mu'awiya I	Anbasa	Utba	Muhammad	Ramla
Ramla	Abd Allah	Yazid I (r. 680–683)	Uthman	Al-Walid	Uthman
Abd al-Malik (r. 685–705)	Atika	Mu'awiya II (r. 683–684)	Khalid	Abd Allah	Abd Allah	Qasim	Yazid	Atika
Yazid II (r. 720–724)	Abd Allah	Harb	Yazid	Ziyad	Muhammad	Umm Yazid	Sulayman (r. 715–717)	Abda	Hisham (r. 724–743)
Al-Walid II (r. 743–744)	Ali	Abu Sufyan	Abu Sufyan	Hashim	Abbas	Yazid
Qasim	Sa'id	Mu'awiya
Uthman

Dashed line indicates marriage
Italicized indicates female
Sufyanid caliphs
Marwanid caliphs
Nominated successors to the caliph
Sufyanid claimants to the caliphate during Abbasid rule

== Bibliography ==
- Bosworth, C.E. (1993). "Muʿāwiya II". In Bosworth, C. E.; van Donzel, E.; Heinrichs, W. P. & Pellat, Ch. (eds.). The Encyclopaedia of Islam, Second Edition. Volume VII: Mif–Naz. Leiden: E. J. Brill. pp. 268–269. ISBN 978-90-04-09419-2.
- Hawting, G. R., ed. (1989). The History of al-Ṭabarī, Volume XX: The Collapse of Sufyānid Authority and the Coming of the Marwānids: The Caliphates of Muʿāwiyah II and Marwān I and the Beginning of the Caliphate of ʿAbd al-Malik, A.D. 683–685/A.H. 64–66. SUNY Series in Near Eastern Studies. Albany, New York: State University of New York Press. ISBN 978-0-88706-855-3.
- Howard, I. K. A., ed. (1990). The History of al-Ṭabarī, Volume XIX: The Caliphate of Yazīd ibn Muʿāwiyah, A.D. 680–683/A.H. 60–64. SUNY Series in Near Eastern Studies. Albany, New York: State University of New York Press. ISBN 978-0-7914-0040-1.
- Morony, Michael G., ed. (1987). The History of al-Ṭabarī, Volume XVIII: Between Civil Wars: The Caliphate of Muʿāwiyah, 661–680 A.D./A.H. 40–60. SUNY Series in Near Eastern Studies. Albany, New York: State University of New York Press. ISBN 978-0-87395-933-9.
- Vaglieri, L. Veccia (1971). "(Al-)Ḥusayn b. ʿAlī ibn Abī Ṭālib". In Lewis, B.; Ménage, V. L.; Pellat, Ch. & Schacht, J. (eds.). The Encyclopaedia of Islam, Second Edition. Volume III: H–Iram. Leiden: E. J. Brill. pp. 607–615. OCLC 495469525.

Political offices
Preceded by Marwan ibn al-Hakam	Governor of Medina; 677/78–680	Succeeded by Amr ibn Sa'id ibn al-As
Preceded by Amr ibn Sa'id ibn al-As	Governor of Medina; 681–682	Succeeded by Uthman ibn Muhammad ibn Abi Sufyan
