= Abu Muhammad al-Sufyani =

Umayyad prince and a pretender to the Umayyad Caliphate (died c.754)

Personal details
- Died: c. 754
- Parent(s): Abd Allah ibn Yazid; Umm Uthman bint Sa'id

Military service
- Allegiance: Umayyad dynasty
- Battles/wars: Third Fitna; Revolt of Abu Muhammad al-Sufyani

Ziyād ibn ʿAbd Allāh ibn Yazīd ibn Muʿāwiya (Arabic: زياد بن عبد الله بن يزيد بن معاوية), commonly known as Abū Muḥammad al-Sufyānī (Arabic: أبو محمد السفياني) was an Umayyad prince and a pretender to the Umayyad Caliphate, which had been overthrown by the Iraq-based Abbasid Caliphate in early 750.

Abu Muhammad was a great-grandson of the first Umayyad caliph, Mu'awiya I, and thus belonged to the Sufyanid (Sufyani) line of the Umayyad family, which ruled the caliphate between 661 and 684, after which they were succeeded by the Marwanid line. The last Umayyad caliph, Marwan II (r. 744–750), imprisoned Abu Muhammad until releasing him at the end of his reign, when the Abbasids routed his army at the Battle of the Zab in 750.

To counter the ascendant Abbasids, Abu Muhammad and his tribal supporters from the Banu Kalb and the wider Yaman of Homs and Palmyra joined forces with their traditional rivals, the Qays under Abu al-Ward. Abu Muhammad claimed the mantle of the caliphate and took on the messianic role of the 'Sufyani', who would deliver a golden age for the Syrians. His tribal coalition was defeated by the Abbasids and he fled to the Hejaz, where he was killed during the early reign of Abbasid caliph al-Mansur (r. 754–775).

== Origins ==
Ziyad ibn Abd Allah ibn Yazid ibn Muawiya, commonly known as Abu Muhammad al-Sufyani, was a member of the Sufyanid branch of the Umayyad family. He was the son of Abd Allah ibn Yazid and Umm Uthman bint Sa'id, a daughter of Sa'id ibn al-As. Through his father, he was a grandson of Caliph Yazid I (r. 680–683), while through his mother he was descended from the prominent Umayyad family of Sa'id ibn al-As. He was related to Caliph al-Walid II (r. 743–744) through the latter's aunt, Atika bint Yazid.

Abu Muhammad was a resident of the Damascus area and was noted among the valiant warriors of the Umayyads. In the early stages of the Third Fitna, Caliph al-Walid II dispatched him to challenge the army of Yazid ibn al-Walid, but Abu Muhammad did not follow his orders. After a series of episodes in Homs and Damascus, during which he was twice captured and released, he eventually arrived in Qinnasrin and later Aleppo. The Umayyad caliph Marwan II (r. 744–750) had Abu Muhammad imprisoned in Harran for much of the second half of his reign. Abu Muhammad did not escape his incarceration when other inmates broke out; those inmates were caught and killed by Harran's inhabitants. Marwan released Abu Muhammad after his defeat by the Abbasids at the Battle of the Zab in January 750.

== Revolt ==
Following the Abbasid overthrow of the Umayyads and his release by Marwan II, Abu Muhammad arrived in northern Syria, where he declared himself caliph during the reign of al-Saffah. He adopted the epithet al-Sufyani both as a reference to his descent from Caliph Mu'awiya ibn Abi Sufyan (r. 661–680) and as a claim to the early Islamic messianic figure al-Sufyani. Recognized by thousands of followers, his claim was embraced by many in Syria, particularly the people of Homs, who believed him to be a messiah-like figure who would deliver a golden age and destroy the rising Abbasid Caliphate.

Later in 750, the Qaysi general, Abu al-Ward, launched a revolt to defeat the Abbasids, rallying his kinsmen and other Qaysis and disavowing his allegiance to the Abbasid governor of Syria, Abd Allah ibn Ali. Abu Muhammad joined the revolt as a leader of the Yaman tribal confederation of Homs and Palmyra. Abu Muhammad assumed political leadership of the revolt and issued a claim to leadership of the Umayyad Caliphate, reaching out for support from other Umayyad nobles. Abu al-Ward, meanwhile, served as the revolt's military commander, though this command was likely limited to the Qaysi troops, the Yamani troops being led by al-Asbagh ibn Dhu'ala al-Kalbi. Although the intent of the revolt was to combat the Abbasids, particularly their Khurasani soldiers, it became a joint Qaysi–Yamani effort to gain control of the Umayyad Caliphate.

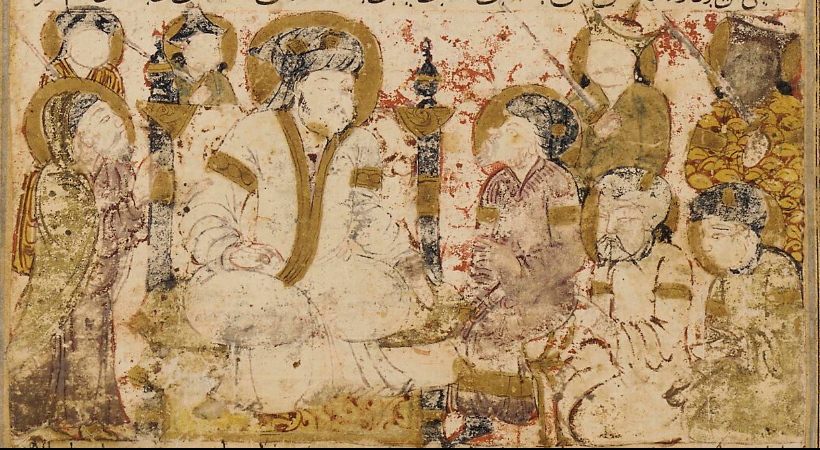
The first Abbasid caliph al-Saffah as he receives pledges of allegiance in Kufa

Despite an initial victory against the Abbasids led by Abd al-Samad ibn Ali at Qinnasrin, Abu Muhammad's forces were defeated near Homs. In the latter battle, Abu al-Ward and many of his kinsmen and Qaysi soldiers were killed, while Abu Muhammad fled to Palmyra. The Abbasid commander Bassam ibn Ibrahim attempted and failed to capture Palmyra, but Abu Muhammad fled again, this time heading for the Hejaz (western Arabia). There, he found a safe haven near Mount Uhud. Abu Muhammad and his family remained in Arabia until they were tracked down and killed during Caliph al-Mansur's reign (r. 754–775). Abu Muhammad's revolt, though short-lived, was the most significant threat the Abbasids faced in the period immediately following their successful revolution against the Umayyads. The revolt motivated the Abbasids to track down and eliminate other remnants of the Umayyad dynasty.

== Sufyani ==
The origin, role and identity of the Sufyani in Islamic tradition and Abu Muhammad's place in it is much debated. In the local Syrian context, the Sufyani was seen as a deliverer who would herald a golden age. But in Shi'ite tradition, due to his descent from Abu Sufyan—originally an opponent of Muhammad and the father of Mu'awiya, who was responsible for the downfall of Ali—he was an anti-Muslim figure, a sort of Islamic Antichrist and the opponent of the Mahdi. Scholars have debated the roots of this figure, with some claiming the existence of the legend already during Umayyad times. Henri Lammens suggested that Abu Muhammad was the origin of the legend, and that Syrians believed that after his execution he went into hiding—much like the Shi'ite Mahdi—and would reappear. Wilferd Madelung championed the view that the Sufyani was from the beginning an anti-Mahdi figure, and that he only acquired positive connotations in Syria at a later date. Several later rebels in Syria, from Abu Harb al-Mubarqa in the 840s all the way up to the 15th century, claimed the mantle of the Sufyani.

Sufyanid family tree

Caliph Uthman (r. 644–656)	Abu Sufyan	Prophet Muhammad
Amr	Hanzala	Yazid	Amr	Mu'awiya I	Anbasa	Utba	Muhammad	Ramla
Ramla	Abd Allah	Yazid I (r. 680–683)	Uthman	Al-Walid	Uthman
Abd al-Malik (r. 685–705)	Atika	Mu'awiya II (r. 683–684)	Khalid	Abd Allah	Abd Allah	Qasim	Yazid	Atika
Yazid II (r. 720–724)	Abd Allah	Harb	Yazid	Ziyad	Muhammad	Umm Yazid	Sulayman (r. 715–717)	Abda	Hisham (r. 724–743)
Al-Walid II (r. 743–744)	Ali	Abu Sufyan	Abu Sufyan	Hashim	Abbas	Yazid
Qasim	Sa'id	Mu'awiya
Uthman

Dashed line indicates marriage
Italicized indicates female
Sufyanid caliphs
Marwanid caliphs
Nominated successors to the caliph
Sufyanid claimants to the caliphate during Abbasid rule

== Bibliography ==
- Cobb, Paul M. (2001). White Banners: Contention in 'Abbasid Syria, 750–880. SUNY Press. ISBN 978-0791448809.
- Cook, David (2011). "Early Islamic and Classic Sunni and Shi'a Apocalyptic Movements". In Wessinger, Catherine (ed.). The Oxford Handbook of Millennialism. Oxford University Press. pp. 267–284. ISBN 978-0195301052.
- Najeebabadi, Akbar Shah (2001). The History of Islam, Vol. 2. Darussalam. ISBN 978-9960892887.
- Roggema, Barbara (2009). The Legend of Sergius Baḥīrā: Eastern Christian Apologetics and Apocalyptic in Response to Islam. BRILL. ISBN 978-9004167308.
- Hillenbrand, Carole, ed. (1989). The History of al-Ṭabarī, Volume XXVI: The Waning of the Umayyad Caliphate: Prelude to Revolution, A.D. 738–744/A.H. 121–126. SUNY Series in Near Eastern Studies. Albany, New York: State University of New York Press. ISBN 978-0-88706-810-2.
- Ahmed, Asad Q. (2011). The Religious Elite of the Early Islamic Ḥijāz: Five Prosopographical Case Studies. Oxford: University of Oxford Linacre College Unit for Prosopographical Research. ISBN 978-1-900934-13-8.
