= Abd Allah ibn Yazid =

7th century Umayyad prince and military commander

Abd Allah ibn Yazid عبدالله بن يزيد
- Born: Damascus, Umayyad Caliphate
- Spouse: Atika bint Abd Allah ibn Mu'awiya; Umm Kulthum bint Anbasa bint Abi Sufyan; A'isha bint Sa'id ibn Uthman ibn Affan; Umm Uthman bint Sa'id ibn al-As; Umm Musa bint Amr ibn Sa'id ibn al-As; A'isha bint Zabban ibn al-Asbagh
- Issue: Abu Muhammad; Abu Utba; Abu Sufyan (Abu Aban); Abda
- Tribe: Sufyanid
- Dynasty: Umayyad
- Father: Yazid I
- Mother: Umm Kulthum bint Abd Allah
- Religion: Islam

ʿAbd Allāh ibn Yazīd ibn Muʿāwiya ibn Abī Sufyān (Arabic: عبدالله بن يزيد بن معاوية بن أبي سفيان), commonly known as al-Uswār, was an Umayyad prince from the Sufyanid line of the dynasty. He was the son of Caliph Yazid I (r. 680–683). After the death of his brother, Caliph Mu'awiya II, in 684, he and his brother, Khalid ibn Yazid, were deemed too young to succeed by the pro-Umayyad tribes of Syria, and Umayyad rule was vested in the line of a distant kinsman, Marwan I (r. 684–685). Abd Allah was a famed archer and horseman and commanded part of the army which took over Iraq from anti-Umayyad forces during the Second Fitna in 691.

== Life ==
Abd Allah was the son of the Umayyad caliph Yazid I (r. 680–683) and his wife Umm Kulthum, the daughter of the veteran commander Abd Allah ibn Amir of the Banu Abd Shams, the clan to which the Umayyad family belonged.

After the deaths of Yazid and his eldest son and successor, Mu'awiya II, in 683 and 684, Umayyad rule collapsed across the Caliphate. Most of the provinces and the military districts of Syria, the metropolitan province of the Umayyads, recognized the anti-Umayyad Abd Allah ibn al-Zubayr of Mecca as caliph. The Banu Kalb, old tribal allies of the Sufyanids (the line of Umayyads descended from Yazid's father, founder of the Umayyad Caliphate Mu'awiya I) under whom they held privileged positions in the caliphal court, rallied the Umayyad loyalist tribes in Syria to appoint Mu'awiya II's replacement. In the recriminations in Damascus between supporters and opponents of the Umayyads, the governor Al-Dahhak ibn Qays al-Fihri, who backed Ibn al-Zubayr, arrested Yazid's cousin Al-Walid ibn Utba ibn Abi Sufyan. Still, he was freed by Abd Allah, his brother Khalid, and their Kalbite backers. The chief of the Kalb, Ibn Bahdal, was a cousin of Yazid, and he nominated Khalid and Abd Allah as his candidates for the caliphal office. The other loyalist tribesmen opposed him due to Khalid and Abd Allah's young ages. Instead, a distant Umayyad relative, Marwan ibn al-Hakam, was appointed and led the Umayyad war efforts against the pro-Zubayrid tribes in Syria, defeating their leader Dahhak at the Battle of Marj Rahit in 684.

Abd Allah was known as the "finest archer of the Arabs of his time," according to the historian al-Tabari (d. 923). He was called "al-Uswar," from the Persian word for "horseman." Al-Tabari quoted an unnamed poet as saying of Abd Allah:

The people claim that the best of all Quraysh [the tribe of the Islamic prophet Muhammad and all the caliphs]
when they are mentioned is al-Uswār.

Marwan was succeeded by his son Abd al-Malik, voiding the previous succession arrangements whereby Khalid was heir apparent, followed by another Umayyad, Amr al-Ashdaq ibn Sa'id ibn al-As. The latter led an attempted coup against Abd al-Malik in Damascus in 689, which the Caliph squashed. Abd Allah was married to al-Ashdaq's daughter and counselled him not to respond to summons following the failed coup. Al-Ashdaq dismissed his brother-in-law's concerns and met with the Caliph, who had him executed. Abd Allah later served as the right-wing commander of Caliph Abd al-Malik's army when it wrested control of Iraq from the Zubayrids in the Battle of Maskin in 691. His brother Khalid commanded the left wing.

== Marriages and children ==
Abd Allah was married to his cousin Atika, the daughter of Yazid's brother Abd Allah. He was married to another Sufyanid kinswoman, Umm Kulthum, the daughter of Mu'awiya's brother Anbasa ibn Abi Sufyan. Other Umayyad wives of Abd Allah included A'isha, the daughter of Sa'id ibn Uthman (a son of Caliph Uthman) and Ramla bint Abi Sufyan. He was also wed to Umm Uthman, the daughter of a distant Umayyad kinsman, Sa'id ibn al-As, after the death of her first husband, Khalid ibn Amr, a grandson of Caliph Uthman. With Umm Uthman, Abd Allah had his sons Abu Utba and Abu Sufyan (or Abu Aban, according to al-Baladhuri). He later married Umm Uthman's niece, Umm Musa, who was the daughter of Amr al-Ashdaq ibn Sa'id ibn al-As. Abd Allah was also wed to a woman of the Banu Kalb tribe, A'isha bint Zabban.

Abd Allah's daughter, Abda, married Caliph Hisham ibn Abd al-Malik (r. 724–743). Abd Allah's son Ziyad (Abu Muhammad al-Sufyani) was a Damascus-based commander in the service of Hisham's successor al-Walid II and later proclaimed himself caliph and led a rebellion in Syria against the Abbasids.

Sufyanids

Caliph Uthman (r. 644–656)	Abu Sufyan	Prophet Muhammad
Amr	Hanzala	Yazid	Amr	Mu'awiya I	Anbasa	Utba	Muhammad	Ramla
Ramla	Abd Allah	Yazid I (r. 680–683)	Uthman	Al-Walid	Uthman
Abd al-Malik (r. 685–705)	Atika	Mu'awiya II (r. 683–684)	Khalid	Abd Allah	Abd Allah	Qasim	Yazid	Atika
Yazid II (r. 720–724)	Abd Allah	Harb	Yazid	Ziyad	Muhammad	Umm Yazid	Sulayman (r. 715–717)	Abda	Hisham (r. 724–743)
Al-Walid II (r. 743–744)	Ali	Abu Sufyan	Abu Sufyan	Hashim	Abbas	Yazid
Qasim	Sa'id	Mu'awiya
Uthman

Dashed line indicates marriage
Italicized indicates female
Sufyanid caliphs
Marwanid caliphs
Nominated successors to the caliph
Sufyanid claimants to the caliphate during Abbasid rule

== Bibliography ==
- Ahmed, Asad Q. (2011). The Religious Elite of the Early Islamic Ḥijāz: Five Prosopographical Case Studies. Oxford: University of Oxford Linacre College Unit for Prosopographical Research. ISBN 978-1-900934-13-8.
- Fishbein, Michael, ed. (1990). The History of al-Ṭabarī, Volume XXI: The Victory of the Marwānids, A.D. 685–693/A.H. 66–73. SUNY Series in Near Eastern Studies. Albany, New York: State University of New York Press. ISBN 978-0-7914-0221-4.
- Hawting, G. R., ed. (1989). The History of al-Ṭabarī, Volume XX: The Collapse of Sufyānid Authority and the Coming of the Marwānids: The Caliphates of Muʿāwiyah II and Marwān I and the Beginning of the Caliphate of ʿAbd al-Malik, A.D. 683–685/A.H. 64–66. SUNY Series in Near Eastern Studies. Albany, New York: State University of New York Press. ISBN 978-0-88706-855-3.
- Howard, I. K. A., ed. (1990). The History of al-Ṭabarī, Volume XIX: The Caliphate of Yazīd ibn Muʿāwiyah, A.D. 680–683/A.H. 60–64. SUNY Series in Near Eastern Studies. Albany, New York: State University of New York Press. ISBN 978-0-7914-0040-1.
- Kennedy, Hugh (2001). The Armies of the Caliphs: Military and Society in the Early Islamic State. London and New York: Routledge. ISBN 0-415-25093-5.
- Robinson, Chase F. (2010). "The Violence of the Abbasid Revolution". In Suleiman, Yasir (ed.). Living Islamic History: Studies in Honour of Professor Carole Hillenbrand. Edinburgh: Edinburgh University Press. pp. 226–251. ISBN 978-0-7486-3738-6.
- Robinson, Majied (2020). Marriage in the Tribe of Muhammad: A Statistical Study of Early Arabic Genealogical Literature. Berlin: Walter de Gruyter. ISBN 9783110624168.
