= Utba ibn Abi Sufyan =

Governor of Egypt (664–665)

Utba ibn Abi Sufyan عتبة بن أبي سفيان

Governor of Egypt
- In office 664–665
- Monarch: Mu'awiya I (r. 661–680)
- Preceded by: Abd Allah ibn Amr ibn al-As
- Succeeded by: Uqba ibn Amir

Personal details
- Died: 665 or later
- Relations: Banu Umayya (clan)
- Children: Al-Walid
- Parents: Abu Sufyan ibn Harb (father); Hind bint Utba (mother)

Military service
- Battles/wars: First Fitna; Battle of the Camel; Battle of Siffin

Utba ibn Abi Sufyan ibn Harb (Arabic: عتبة بن أبي سفيان بن حرب, romanized: ʿUtba ibn Abī Sufyān ibn Ḥarb) was a member of the Umayyad dynasty, an early Islamic administrator, and a military commander who served as the Umayyad governor of Egypt in 664–665. Born during the lifetime of the Islamic prophet Muhammad, he rose to administrative prominence under Caliph Umar, governing Taif before becoming closely entangled in the political crises of the First Fitna. A staunch loyalist to his family's interests, he witnessed the assassination of Caliph Uthman, fought against Caliph Ali at the Battle of the Camel and the Battle of Siffin, and helped broker his family's rise to supreme power under his brother, Caliph Mu'awiya I (r. 661–680).

== Early life and career ==
Utba was a son of Abu Sufyan ibn Harb of the Umayyad clan and Hind bint Utba, and was born during the lifetime of the Islamic prophet Muhammad. Under Caliph Umar ibn al-Khattab (r. 634–644), he served as governor of Taif and was charged with collecting the sadaqat (tribute) from the Kinana tribe based around Mecca. He was a witness to the assassination of Caliph Uthman ibn Affan (r. 644–656).

== First Fitna ==
He later fought alongside most of the Quraysh led by the Islamic prophet Muhammad's wife Aisha against Muhammad's cousin, Caliph Ali (r. 656–661), in the Battle of the Camel near Basra in 656. In the immediate aftermath of Ali's victory, Utba took refuge with Aisha and avoided giving allegiance to Ali. He soon after managed to escape to Damascus, where his brother, Mu'awiya ruled as governor of Syria. In the alliance negotiations between Mu'awiya and Amr ibn al-As, Utba pressed his brother to accept Amr's offer of receiving the lifetime governorship of Egypt in return for his support against Ali. Utba was later part of Mu'awiya's retinue during the Battle of Siffin, then serving as a witness to the arbitration document established to resolve the conflict. Mu'awiya became caliph in 661 and appointed Utba to lead the annual Hajj pilgrimage to Mecca in March 662.

== Governorship of Egypt and later years ==
Following the death of Amr in 664, his son Abd Allah was appointed governor of Egypt for a few weeks before being removed, paving the way for Utba's appointment. Immediately after taking office, Utba sought to consolidate political ties with the provincial elite by leading a delegation of local Egyptian notables (ashraf ahl-Misr) to Damascus to meet Caliph Mu'awiya I.

Utba subsequently traveled to Alexandria, making him recorded in Arabic sources as the first Arab governor of Egypt to personally visit the city, although al-Baladhuri implies that Amr had entered it previously during its conquest. During this visit, he strengthened the Muslim Arab presence and elevated the city's political status by initially attaching 12,000 Arab troops to the garrison. This force was subsequently expanded when Caliph Mu'awiya further bolstered Alexandria's strategic defenses with non-Egyptian regiments, bringing the total garrison to between 20,000 and 27,000 troops. To support this military expansion, Utba constructed a Dar al-Imara (governor's palace) in the city, which was intended to serve as the residence of the provincial governor who was primarily based in Fustat. Despite these substantial reinforcements, Utba remained concerned that the garrison size was still vulnerable given the large local Christian population in Alexandria.

Utba died in office in 665 and was succeeded by the muleteer of Muhammad, Uqba ibn Amir. However, according to the 9th-century historian al-Tabari, Utba led the annual pilgrimage (Hajj) in February 667, and either he or his brother Anbasa led it again the following year in January 668.

Utba's son al-Walid later served as governor of Medina under Mu'awiya and Caliph Yazid I (r. 680–683). A descendant of Utba, Abd Allah ibn Muhammad al-Utbi, is frequently cited as an informational source in the historical chronicles of al-Tabari.

Sufyanid family tree

Caliph Uthman (r. 644–656)	Abu Sufyan	Prophet Muhammad
Amr	Hanzala	Yazid	Amr	Mu'awiya I	Anbasa	Utba	Muhammad	Ramla
Ramla	Abd Allah	Yazid I (r. 680–683)	Uthman	Al-Walid	Uthman
Abd al-Malik (r. 685–705)	Atika	Mu'awiya II (r. 683–684)	Khalid	Abd Allah	Abd Allah	Qasim	Yazid	Atika
Yazid II (r. 720–724)	Abd Allah	Harb	Yazid	Ziyad	Muhammad	Umm Yazid	Sulayman (r. 715–717)	Abda	Hisham (r. 724–743)
Al-Walid II (r. 743–744)	Ali	Abu Sufyan	Abu Sufyan	Hashim	Abbas	Yazid
Qasim	Sa'id	Mu'awiya
Uthman

Dashed line indicates marriage
Italicized indicates female
Sufyanid caliphs
Marwanid caliphs
Nominated successors to the caliph
Sufyanid claimants to the caliphate during Abbasid rule

== Bibliography ==
- Brinner, William, ed. (1987). The History of al-Ṭabarī, Volume II: Prophets and Patriarchs. SUNY Series in Near Eastern Studies. Albany, New York: State University of New York Press. ISBN 978-0-87395-921-6.
- Bruning, Jelle (2018). The Rise of a Capital: Al-Fusṭāṭ and Its Hinterland, 18-132/639-750. Leiden and Boston: Brill. ISBN 978-90-04-36635-0.
- Donner, Fred M. (1981). The Early Islamic Conquests. Princeton: Princeton University Press. ISBN 0-691-05327-8.
- Kennedy, Hugh (1998). "Egypt as a Province in the Islamic Caliphate, 641–868". In Petry, Carl F. (ed.). Cambridge History of Egypt, Volume One: Islamic Egypt, 640–1517. Cambridge: Cambridge University Press. pp. 62–85. ISBN 0-521-47137-0.
- Madelung, Wilferd (1997). The Succession to Muhammad: A Study of the Early Caliphate. Cambridge: Cambridge University Press. ISBN 0-521-56181-7.
- Morony, Michael G., ed. (1987). The History of al-Ṭabarī, Volume XVIII: Between Civil Wars: The Caliphate of Muʿāwiyah, 661–680 A.D./A.H. 40–60. SUNY Series in Near Eastern Studies. Albany, New York: State University of New York Press. ISBN 978-0-87395-933-9.
- Hawting, G. R., ed. (1996). The History of al-Ṭabarī, Volume XVII: The First Civil War: From the Battle of Siffīn to the Death of ʿAlī, A.D. 656–661/A.H. 36–40. SUNY Series in Near Eastern Studies. Albany, New York: State University of New York Press. ISBN 978-0-7914-2393-6.
- Rosenthal, Franz (2015). Man versus Society in Medieval Islam. Leiden and Boston: Brill. ISBN 978-90-04-27088-6.
- Gordon, Matthew S.; Robinson, Chase F.; Rowson, Everett K.; Fishbein, Michael, eds. (2018). The Works of Ibn Wāḍiḥ al-Yaʿqūbī: An English Translation. Vol. 3. Brill. ISBN 978-90-04-36416-5.
- Berkes, Lajos (2022). Christians and Muslims in Early Islamic Egypt. University of Michigan Press. ISBN 978-0-979975-89-9.
- Lev, Yaacov (2020). The Administration of Justice in Medieval Egypt: From the 7th to the 12th Century. Edinburgh University Press. ISBN 978-1-4744-5926-6.

Preceded by Abd Allah ibn Amr ibn al-As	Governor of Egypt; 664–665	Succeeded by Uqba ibn Amir
