= Uthman ibn Muhammad ibn Abi Sufyan =

Governor of Medina (682–683)

Uthman ibn Muhammad عثمان بن محمد

Governor of Medina
- In office 682–683
- Monarch: Yazid I
- Preceded by: Al-Walid ibn Utba ibn Abi Sufyan
- Succeeded by: None

Personal details
- Relations: Umayyad dynasty (clan)
- Children: Yazid; Atika
- Parent(s): Muhammad ibn Abi Sufyan; Umm Uthman bint Usayd al-Thaqafi

ʿUthman ibn Muḥammad ibn Abī Sufyān (Arabic: عثمان بن محمد بن أبي سفيان) (fl. 682 – c. 683) was a member of the Umayyad ruling family who served as the governor of Medina under the Umayyad caliph Yazid I (r. 680–683) in 682 until being expelled by its townspeople in 683 during the Second Fitna.

== Life ==
Uthman belonged to the ruling family of the Umayyad Caliphate and was a grandson of Abu Sufyan ibn Harb, making him a paternal cousin of Caliph Yazid I. His parents were Muhammad ibn Abi Sufyan and Umm Uthman bint Usayd ibn Akhnas ibn Shariq of the Banu Thaqif tribe.

Yazid appointed Uthman governor of Medina in 682, replacing their other cousin, al-Walid ibn Utba ibn Abi Sufyan. According to an account recorded in the history of the 9th-century historian al-Tabari, Uthman's appointment came about as a result of a ploy by the Mecca-based, anti-Umayyad claimant to the caliphate, Abd Allah ibn al-Zubayr. The latter had sent a letter disparaging al-Walid ibn Utba as unfit and suggesting he be replaced by a governor more inclined to cooperation. Yazid responded by installing Uthman. According to the historian Julius Wellhausen, Uthman was "a young man, inexperienced and conceited".

In an effort to conciliate the growing opposition to Yazid in Medina, Uthman sent an embassy of city notables to Yazid's court in Damascus in hopes that the caliph would secure their support with financial incentives; though Yazid gave them numerous gifts, they returned to Medina with reports of the caliph's misdeeds and lack of religion. Afterward, the townspeople of Medina, led by a member of the embassy, Abd Allah ibn Hanzala, revolted against Yazid and assaulted Uthman. The Umayyads and their mawali (non-Arab clients) and supporters among the Quraysh, numbering some 1,000 people, were likewise attacked and found refuge with the senior Umayyad of the region, Marwan ibn al-Hakam. Uthman, being "only a young lad without any judgement", according to al-Tabari, was sidelined by Marwan who managed the Hejazi Umayyads during this crisis. The Umayyads ultimately relocated to Syria, the political center of the Umayyad Caliphate.

There is scant information available about Uthman beyond his short term in Medina. One of his daughters, Atika, was later wed to the Umayyad caliph al-Walid II (r. 743–744).

Sufyanids (Descendants of Abu Sufyan)

Caliph Uthman (r. 644–656)	Abu Sufyan	Prophet Muhammad
Amr	Hanzala	Yazid	Amr	Mu'awiya I	Anbasa	Utba	Muhammad	Ramla
Ramla	Abd Allah	Yazid I (r. 680–683)	Uthman	Al-Walid	Uthman
Abd al-Malik (r. 685–705)	Atika	Mu'awiya II (r. 683–684)	Khalid	Abd Allah	Abd Allah	Qasim	Yazid	Atika
Yazid II (r. 720–724)	Abd Allah	Harb	Yazid	Ziyad	Muhammad	Umm Yazid	Sulayman (r. 715–717)	Abda	Hisham (r. 724–743)
Al-Walid II (r. 743–744)	Ali	Abu Sufyan	Abu Sufyan	Hashim	Abbas	Yazid
Qasim	Sa'id	Mu'awiya
Uthman

Dashed line indicates marriage
Italicized indicates female
Sufyanid caliphs
Marwanid caliphs
Nominated successors to the caliph
Sufyanid claimants to the caliphate during Abbasid rule

== Bibliography ==
- Howard, I. K. A., ed. (1990). The History of al-Ṭabarī, Volume XIX: The Caliphate of Yazīd ibn Muʿāwiyah, A.D. 680–683/A.H. 60–64. SUNY Series in Near Eastern Studies. Albany, New York: State University of New York Press. ISBN 978-0-7914-0040-1.
- Robinson, Majied (2020). Marriage in the Tribe of Muhammad: A Statistical Study of Early Arabic Genealogical Literature. Berlin: Walter de Gruyter. ISBN 9783110624168.
- Wellhausen, Julius (1927). The Arab Kingdom and Its Fall. Translated by Margaret Graham Weir. Calcutta: University of Calcutta.
- Al-Ya'qubi, Ahmad ibn Abu Ya'qub (1883). Houtsma, M. Th. (ed.). Historiae, Vol. 2. Leiden: E. J. Brill.
- Khalifah ibn Khayyat (1985). al-Umari, Akram Diya' (ed.). Tarikh Khalifah ibn Khayyat, 3rd ed (in Arabic). Al-Riyadh: Dar Taybah.
- The Encyclopaedia of Islam, Second Edition (12 vols.). Leiden: E. J. Brill. 1960–2005.
- Yarshater, Ehsan, ed. (1985–2007). The History of al-Ṭabarī (40 vols). SUNY Series in Near Eastern Studies. Albany, New York: State University of New York Press. ISBN 978-0-7914-7249-1.

Political offices
Preceded by Al-Walid ibn Utba ibn Abi Sufyan	Governor of Medina; 682–683	Succeeded by Vacant
