= Khalid ibn Yazid =

Umayyad prince and legendary alchemist

Khalid ibn Yazid خالد بن يزيد

Governor of Jund Hims
- In office 684–685
- Monarch: Marwan I
- Preceded by: Nu'man ibn Bashir
- Succeeded by: Aban ibn al-Walid ibn Uqba

Personal details
- Born: c. 668 CE (48 AH) Umayyad Caliphate
- Died: 704 CE (85 AH) or 709 CE (90 AH)
- Resting place: Khalid ibn al-Walid Mosque, Homs (tentative)
- Spouses: A'isha bint Abd al-Malik ibn Marwan; Ramla bint al-Zubayr ibn al-Awwamn; Amina bint Sa'id ibn al-As; Umm Kulthum bint Ja'far ibn Abi Talib
- Children: Yazid; Harb; Abd Allah
- Parents: Yazid I (father); Fakhita bint Abi Hashim ibn Utba ibn Rabi'a (mother)
- Occupation: Caliphal adviser, military commander, poet, purported alchemist and patron of the sciences
- Religion: Islam

Khālid ibn Yazīd ibn Muʿāwiya ibn Abī Sufyān (Note: Arabic: خالد بن يزيد بن معاوية بن أبي سفيان) (c. 668–704 or 709), was an Umayyad prince and purported alchemist.

As a son of the Umayyad caliph Yazid I, Khalid was supposed to become caliph after his elder brother Mu'awiya II died in 684. However, Marwan I, a senior Umayyad from another branch of the clan, was chosen over the much younger Khalid. Despite having lost the caliphate to Marwan, Khalid forged close ties with Marwan's son and successor, the caliph Abd al-Malik, who appointed him to successive administrative and military roles. He participated in a number of successful military campaigns in 691, but then chose to retire to his Homs estate, where he lived out the rest of his life. He may have engaged in some level of poetry and hadith scholarship.

A large number of alchemical writings were attributed to Khalid, including also many alchemical poems. Khalid's purported alchemical activity was probably part of a legend that evolved in 9th-century Arabic literary circles, which also falsely credited him with sponsoring the first translations of Greek philosophical and scientific works into Arabic (in reality, caliphal sponsorship of translations started during the reign of al-Mansur, 754–775).

Some of the Arabic alchemical works attributed to Khalid were later translated into Latin under the Latinized name Calid. One of these works, the Liber de compositione alchemiae ("Book on the Composition of Alchemy"), was the first Arabic work on alchemy to be translated into Latin, by Robert of Chester in 1144.

== Life ==
=== Family background ===
Khalid was likely born around 668. He was a son of the Umayyad caliph Yazid I (r. 680–683) and Fakhita ibn Abi Hashim ibn Utba ibn Rabi'a, a woman of the Quraysh.

=== Politics of caliphal succession ===
When his older half-brother Mu'awiya II died after a short reign as caliph in 684, Khalid was still a minor. By then, the Umayyads had lost control over most of the caliphate, including large parts of their Syrian metropolis, to Ibn al-Zubayr of Mecca, who had declared himself caliph in 683. Loyalists tribes in Syria, particularly the Banu Kalb and its Quda'a confederation and their allies the Ghassan and Kinda, scrambled to shore up Umayyad rule and, by extension, preserve the privileges which they had enjoyed under the Umayyads. In a summit of the Syrian tribal elite at Jabiya in the summer of 684, the preeminent chief of the Kalb, Ibn Bahdal, who was a maternal cousin of Yazid I, proposed Khalid and then his younger brother Abd Allah, succeed to the Umayyad throne. Most of the other tribal nobles opted for Marwan ibn al-Hakam, an elder statesman from a different branch of the Umayyad family than the ruling Sufyanids (the descendants of the first Umayyad caliph Mu'awiya I).

The Jabiya summit concluded with an agreement nominating Marwan as caliph to be succeeded by Khalid and then another Umayyad from a third branch of the family, Amr al-Ashdaq. As part of the agreement, Khalid was also to be invested with the governorship of Jund Hims (military district of Homs). A different set of traditions denies that Marwan's accession was conditioned on Khalid's and al-Ashdaq's successions and shows Ibn Bahdal rallying behind Marwan against al-Ashdaq and in favor of Marwan's appointment of his own sons, Abd al-Malik and Abd al-Aziz, as his successors in 685. According to the historian Joshua Mabra, it is more likely no firm decision regarding Marwan's caliphal heirs was reached at Jabiya; rather, there were only preferences by the different stakeholders and their choices may have changed in the ensuing chaotic months as the Umayyads struggled to regain control of the caliphate amid the Second Fitna.

To stifle Khalid's ambitions to the succession, Marwan married his mother Fakhita, who had aimed to secure Khalid's place, thereby becoming Khalid's stepfather and gaining authority over him. The move embarrassed Khalid and diminished his influence. The historian Julius Wellhausen considered it "a seizure" of Khalid's "inheritance". Marwan further reduced Khalid by humiliating him publicly. Marwan's accession and his success winning over the powerful Banu Kalb in removing Khalid and al-Ashdaq from the line of succession in favor of his own sons has generally confounded historians, according to Mabra. The latter proposes that Marwan's son Abd al-Aziz being the second in line to succeed him eased matters with the Kalb, as Abd al-Aziz's mother was a Kalbid noblewoman and therefore represented the "continuation of the [Umayyad] link with the Kalb". When Khalid reminded Marwan of the promise he made at his ascension, Marwan publicly insulted his mother Fakhita. According to what is probably a later legend, Fakhita killed Marwan in revenge.

Despite the tensions with Marwan, close ties developed between Khalid and Abd al-Malik, and when the latter acceded in 685, Khalid married his daughter A'isha. Abd al-Malik, in turn, married Khalid's sister, Atika bint Yazid, who became the caliph's favorite wife. Khalid also married other noblewomen of the Quraysh, including Umm Kulthum, the daughter of Ja'far ibn Abi Talib of the Banu Hashim (the clan of the Umayyads' Alid rivals), Amina, the daughter of Sa'id ibn al-As and sister of al-Ashdaq, and Ramla bint al-Zubayr, the sister of the Umayyads' principal adversary, Ibn al-Zubayr. The last marriage was particularly controversial and occurred when Khalid made the Hajj pilgrimage to Mecca after the Umayyads killed Ibn al-Zubayr and restored control over the holy city. Abd al-Malik's governor there, al-Hajjaj ibn Yusuf, objected to Khalid's proposal to Ramla, but Khalid married her anyway. (Note: Khalid's proposal and marriage to Ramla bint al-Zubayr, his arguments with al-Hajjaj over the issue and Ramla's claims of her family's equal standing with that of the prophet Muhammad's own clan are all found in the 10th-century Kitab al-aghani ('Book of Songs' by Abu al-Faraj al-Isfahani). Around the same time, Khalid opposed al-Hajjaj's marriage to Umm Kulthum bint Ja'far ibn Abi Talib (who later married Khalid), supposedly persuading Abd al-Malik to force al-Hajjaj to divorce her, lest an alliance be formed between al-Hajjaj and the Banu Hashim against Umayyad interests in the Hejaz.) According to historian Antoine Borrut, Khalid's marriages appear strategic and suggest Khalid remained a "strong contender for the caliphate". Indeed, a court poet of Abd al-Malik is said to have warned the caliph: "beware Khālid, for he is hostile to your interests; / When we look at the wives he has married, we realise what he intends".

=== Military commands and role in the Qays–Yaman rivalry ===
Amid the Second Fitna, a tribal schism developed in Syria, pitting the Kalb and the wider Quda'a and its allies against the pro-Zubayrid Qays tribes, which became a long-running conflict after the Umayyads' and Kalb's victory at the Battle of Marj Rahit in 684. The defeated Qays made their base at al-Qarqisiya on the Euphrates under Zufar ibn al-Harith al-Kilabi. In the summer of 691, Abd al-Malik appointed Khalid as a commander in the siege of Zufar.

Zufar capitulated after a negotiated surrender by which the Qays were reintegrated into the Umayyad army, to the chagrin of the Kalb. The peace was sealed by the marriage of Abd al-Malik's son Maslama to Zufar's daughter. In later years Maslama emerged as a champion of the Qays, while Khalid worked to build up the strength of the Kalb–Quda'a. Khalid is credited with encouraging the Quda'a's adoption of a South Arabian lineage to facilitate their alliance with the potent South Arabian tribes of Jund Hims. This alliance generated the Yaman ('South Arabia') tribal coalition whose rivalry with Qays undermined Umayyad rule until its fall in 750. Despite the reconciliation with the caliph, clashes between the Kalb and Qaysi tribes persisted and, in 692, Khalid likely provided the Kalbi chief Humayd ibn Hurayth ibn Bahdal a forged letter of appointment from Abd al-Malik to forcibly collect taxes from the Qaysi Fazara tribe; the assignment manifested in a devastating Kalbid raid against the Fazara. Khalid's involvement in these tribal-political machinations was likely motivated by a desire to stifle tribal support for the ruling Marwanids and widen his own potential tribal support base.

After the victory at Qarqisiya, Abd al-Malik appointed Khalid and his brother Abd Allah as commanders of his army's left and right wings at the Battle of Maskin (691) against Ibn al-Zubayr's brother and governor of Iraq, Mus'ab ibn al-Zubayr, which ended with the Umayyad conquest of Zubayrid Iraq. Khalid and his brother were likely appointed for their high status among the Quda'a tribesmen who until then dominated the Umayyad army.

=== Advisor of Abd al-Malik ===
From the time of Abd al-Malik's accession, Khalid acted as an adviser to the caliph. He is credited in some Islamic histories, including al-Baladhuri, for persuading Abd al-Malik to enact one of his key reforms, dicontinuing the production of Byzantine gold coins and minting gold dinars with the Muslim statement of belief and Quranic formulas. In the same vein, he is held to have been behind Abd al-Malik's circulation of Greek papyri in Byzantine territory with Muslim religious messaging. In c. 700, Khalid served as an adviser of Abd al-Malik regarding the revolt of Ibn al-Ash'ath in Iraq.

=== Scholarly pursuits ===
After his military spell in 691, Khalid appears to have spent the rest of his life in Homs, which had been appointed to him as an emirate already by Marwan. He engaged in poetry and hadith scholarship. A substantial corpus of Khalid's poetry was likely available in 10th-century Baghdad, the center of the Islamic Golden Age, with Ibn al-Nadim claiming to have viewed "five hundred leaves" of his poems. Ibn Qutayba referred to Khalid as "the most learned of Quraysh in the various fields of knowledge". Surviving poetry from Khalid is found in the Kitab al-aghani ('Book of Songs') by Abu al-Faraj al-Isfahani centering on his romance with Ramla. The modern scholar Dapsens traced more than 450 poems attributed to Khalid. A wide range of intellectual works spanning alchemy, philosophy, medicine and astrology are attributed to Khalid by the early Islamic tradition.

=== Death and descendants ===
He died in 704 or 709. An alternative Islamic tradition places the grave of Khalid ibn Yazid in Homs, at the site which came to be associated, starting in the 12th century, with the mausoleum of the famous early Muslim general Khalid ibn al-Walid in Homs.

Descendants of Khalid recorded in the sources include his son Harb, whose traditions about Mu'awiya I are cited by al-Mada'ini. (Note: Harb ibn Khalid ibn Yazid's grandson, Sa'id, was married to a great-great-granddaughter of Caliph Uthman (r. 644–656) (A'isha bint Sa'id ibn Abdallah ibn al-Walid ibn Uthman), and lived in Syria in the 9th century.) Another son of Khalid, Yazid, and the latter's grandson Mu'awiya ibn Abi Sufyan ibn Yazid, were commanders serving Caliph al-Walid II (r. 743–744), whose father Yazid II (r. 720–724) was Khalid's nephew (the son of his sister Atika). During the Third Fitna, Mu'awiya ibn Abi Sufyan defected to al-Walid II's Umayyad rivals, who sought to install Yazid III as caliph. In the aftermath of al-Walid II's assassination and the accession of Yazid III in 744, the new caliph imprisoned Yazid ibn Khalid and other Sufyanids in Mu'awiya I's Khadra Palace in Damascus. In the aftermath of the Abbasid Revolution's toppling of the Umayyad dynasty in 750, several Sufyanids led revolts against the Abbasids in Syria. Among them was the short-lived rebellion of Yazid ibn Khalid's son, Hashim (or Hisham), who was proclaimed caliph by Yamani rebels in Damascus in 754–755.

In the late Umayyad and early Abbasid periods, prophecies, apocalyptic in nature, emerged centering on a figure known as al-Sufyani ('the Sufyanid'), who was viewed either as a redeemer of Syrian fortunes amid the region's loss of power to the Abbasids, whose power rested in Iraq and the eastern caliphate, or an antichrist-like counterpart to the Mahdi. The 9th-century Muslim scholar Mus'ab ibn Abd Allah al-Zubayri claimed the legend of al-Sufyani was first circulated by Khalid as a means to stir hopes of a redeemer of Sufyanid rule amid Marwan I's usurpation of the Sufyanid throne. This view was endorsed by Theodore Noldeke, who argued al-Sufyani was invented to promote Sufyanid interests against the Marwanids but was later turned into an Umayyad antichrist by orthodox Muslim scholars in the post-Umayyad period. This view is doubted by later orientalists Julius Wellhausen and Henri Lammens, who connected the legend's origin to Khalid's nephew, Abu Muhammad al-Sufyani, who raised a potent anti-Abbasid rebellion in Syria in c. 751. Khalid's great-grandson, Abu al-Umaytir al-Sufyani (Ali ibn Abd Allah ibn Khalid), declared himself caliph in Damascus in 811–813, during the Fourth Fitna and gained traction among Syrians partly due to propaganda efforts by his supporters promoting him as the region's foretold Sufyani redeemer.

Sufyanids

Caliph Uthman (r. 644–656)	Abu Sufyan	Prophet Muhammad
Amr	Hanzala	Yazid	Amr	Mu'awiya I	Anbasa	Utba	Muhammad	Ramla
Ramla	Abd Allah	Yazid I (r. 680–683)	Uthman	Al-Walid	Uthman
Abd al-Malik (r. 685–705)	Atika	Mu'awiya II (r. 683–684)	Khalid	Abd Allah	Abd Allah	Qasim	Yazid	Atika
Yazid II (r. 720–724)	Abd Allah	Harb	Yazid	Ziyad	Muhammad	Umm Yazid	Sulayman (r. 715–717)	Abda	Hisham (r. 724–743)
Al-Walid II (r. 743–744)	Ali	Abu Sufyan	Abu Sufyan	Hashim	Abbas	Yazid
Qasim	Sa'id	Mu'awiya
Uthman

Dashed line indicates marriage
Italicized indicates female
Sufyanid caliphs
Marwanid caliphs
Nominated successors to the caliph
Sufyanid claimants to the caliphate during Abbasid rule

== Legend ==
A number of Arabic treatises on alchemy and alchemical poems have been attributed to Khalid. These writings are generally regarded as pseudepigraphs (false attributions) dating from the 8th or 9th centuries at the very earliest. It is not clear why these works were attributed to Khalid specifically.

According to one theory advanced by the German scholar Manfred Ullmann, the idea that Khalid had been interested in alchemy originated in the 9th-century historian al-Baladhuri, who quoted his teacher al-Mada'ini's description of Khalid as "pursuing that which is impossible, that is, alchemy". According to Ullmann's theory, al-Mada'ini's lost work would have read "pursuing that which is impossible" (referring to Khalid's failure to ascend to the caliphate), while the words "that is, alchemy" would have been added as an interpretative gloss by al-Baladhuri, who thus sparked the legend of Khalid as an alchemist. According to another theory proposed by the French scholar Pierre Lory, the writings attributed to Khalid were originally written in a much humbler environment than the courtly milieus in which most 8th- and 9th-century philosophers and scientists worked, and were purposefully attributed to an Umayyad prince to lend them an aura of nobility.

In any case, Khalid was widely associated with alchemy from the 9th century on by such authors as al-Jahiz (776–868/869), al-Baladhuri (820–892), al-Tabari (839–923), and Abu al-Faraj al-Isfahani (897–967). He was also credited by al-Jahiz and later by Ibn al-Nadim (c. 932–995) with having been the first to order the translation of Greek philosophical and scientific works into Arabic. In reality, however, these translations only started in the late 8th century (at the very earliest during the reign of the Abbasid caliph al-Mansur, r. 754–775), and the credit given for them to Khalid is generally held to be part of the legend surrounding him.

== Alchemical writings ==
The great majority of alchemical works attributed to Khalid have not yet been studied. A relatively large amount of Arabic works are still extant. There are also some works which have been preserved in Latin, either with or without corresponding Arabic original.

=== Arabic works ===
The following Arabic works are extant:

- Dīwān al-nujūm wa-firdaws al-ḥikma ("The Diwan of the Stars and the Paradise of Wisdom", a collection (dīwān) of alchemical poems and treatises compiled at a relatively late date)
- Kitāb al-Usṭuqus ("The Book of the Element")
- Kitāb Waṣiyyatihi ilā ibnihi fī al-ṣanʿa ("The Book of his Testament to his Son on the Art")
- Masāʾil Khālid li-Maryānus al-rāhib ("Khalid's Questions to the Monk Maryanos"), also known as Risālat Maryānus al-rāhib al-ḥakīm li-l-amīr Khālid ibn Yazīd ("Epistle of the Wise Monk Maryanos to the Prince Khalid ibn Yazid") or in its Latin translation as Liber de compositione alchemiae ("Book on the Composition of Alchemy") or Testamentum Morieni ("Testament of Morienus"), perhaps dating to the late 10th century (Note: Partial edition of the Arabic text and English translation in Al-Hassan 2004; full critical edition of the Arabic text and French translation in Dapsens 2021a. The Latin translation was edited by Stavenhagen 1974, but this edition is now superseded by the critical edition of two Latin versions with French translation in Dapsens 2021a.)
- al-Qawl al-mufīd fī al-ṣanʿa al-ilāhiyya ("The Instructive Word on the Divine Art")
- Risāla fī al-ṣanʿa al-sharīfa wa-khawāṣṣihā ("Epistle on the Noble Art and its Properties")
- Various unnamed alchemical treatises, poems and epistles

A number of Arabic works listed by Ibn al-Nadim in his Fihrist (written 987) are now presumably lost:

- Kitāb al-Ḥarārāt
- Kitāb al-Ṣaḥīfa al-kabīr
- Kitāb al-Ṣaḥīfa al-ṣaghīr

=== Latin works ===
There also exist a number of Latin alchemical writings attributed to Khalid, whose name was Latinized in these works as Calid filius Jazidi. It is doubtful whether some of these are actual translations from the Arabic, but at least two Latin treatises have been found to closely correspond with an existing Arabic original. One of these is the Liber de compositione alchemiae ("Book on the Composition of Alchemy", translation of the Masāʾil Khālid li-Maryānus al-rāhib mentioned above), which contains a dialogue between Khalid and the semi-legendary Byzantine monk Morienus (Arabic: مريانس, Maryānus, perhaps from Greek Μαριανός, Marianos). It was the first full-length Arabic alchemical work to be translated into Latin, a task which was completed on 11 February 1144 by the English Arabist Robert of Chester. Another work which is extant both in Arabic and in Latin is an untitled Risāla ("Epistle"), whose Latin translator is unknown.

Other Latin texts attributed to Khalid include:

- Liber secretorum alchemiae ("The Book of the Secrets of Alchemy")
- Liber trium verborum ("The Book of the Three Words")

== See also ==
- Alchemy and chemistry in the medieval Islamic world
  - Ibn Umayl
  - Jabir ibn Hayyan
- Hermetica § Arabic alchemical Hermetica
- Latin translations of the 12th century

== Bibliography ==
- Ahmed, Asad Q. (2011). The Religious Elite of the Early Islamic Ḥijāz: Five Prosopographical Case Studies. Oxford: University of Oxford Linacre College Unit for Prosopographical Research. ISBN 978-1-900934-13-8.
- Al-Hassan, Ahmad Y. (2004). "The Arabic Original of the Liber de compositione alchemiae: The Epistle of Maryānus, the Hermit and Philosopher, to Prince Khālid ibn Yazīd". Arabic Sciences and Philosophy. 14 (2): 213–231. doi:10.1017/S0957423904000086. S2CID 170547574.
- Anawati, Georges C. (1996). "Arabic Alchemy". In Rashed, Roshdi (ed.). Encyclopedia of the History of Arabic Science. Vol. 3. London: Routledge. pp. 853–885. ISBN 9780415020633.
- Bacchi, Eleonora; Martelli, Matteo (2009). "Il Principe Halid b. Yazid e le origini dell'alchimia araba". In Cevenini, Daniele; D'Onofrio, Svevo (eds.). Conflitti e Dissensi Nell'Islam. Bologna: Il Ponte Editrice. pp. 85–119. ISBN 9788889465332.
- Borrut, Antoine (2026). Astrology and History in Early Islam: Aligning Heaven and Earth. Edinburgh: Edinburgh University Press. ISBN 9781399558273.
- Bosworth, C.E. (1991). "Marwān I b. al-Ḥakam". In Bosworth, C. E.; van Donzel, E. & Pellat, Ch. (eds.). The Encyclopaedia of Islam, Second Edition. Volume VI: Mahk–Mid. Leiden: E. J. Brill. pp. 621–623. ISBN 978-90-04-08112-3.
- Caetani, Leone (1923). Cronografia generale del bacino mediterraneo e dell'oriente musulmano dal 622 al 1517 dell'era volgare, ossia dal principio dell'era musulmana alla caduta dell'Egitto in potere dei Turchi ottomani Periodo 2 [General Chronography of the Mediterranean Basin and the Muslim East from 622 to 1517 AD, that is, from the Beginning of the Muslim Era to the Fall of Egypt into the Power of the Ottoman Turks. Period 2] (in Italian). CaetaniFoundation.
- Cobb, Paul M. (2001). White Banners: Contention in 'Abbasid Syria, 750–880. Albany, New York: State University of New York Press. ISBN 0-7914-4879-7.
- Crone, Patricia (1994). "Were the Qays and Yemen of the Umayyad Period Political Parties?". Der Islam. 71 (1). Walter de Gruyter and Co.: 1–57. doi:10.1515/islm.1994.71.1.1. ISSN 0021-1818. S2CID 154370527.
- Dapsens, Marion (2016). "De la Risālat Maryānus au De Compositione alchemiae: Quelques réflexions sur la tradition d'un traité d'alchimie" (PDF). Studia graeco-arabica. 6: 121–140.
- Dapsens, Marion (2021a). «Arabice appellatur Elixir» : les Masā'il Khālid li-Maryānus al-rāhib dans leurs versions arabe et latine (PhD dissertation). Université catholique de Louvain. hdl:2078.1/252488.
- Dapsens, Marion (2021b). "The Alchemical Work of Khālid b. Yazīd b. Muʿāwiya (d. c. 85/704)". Asiatische Studien - Études Asiatiques. 75 (2): 327–427. doi:10.1515/asia-2020-0039. S2CID 237586859.
- Dapsens, Marion; Moureau, Sébastien (2021). "The Four Signs of the Art: Edition and Translation of an Alchemical Epistle Attributed to Ḫālid b. Yazīd and its Latin Translation". Arabica. 68 (5–6): 557–627. doi:10.1163/15700585-059000000. hdl:2078.1/225051. S2CID 245603634.
- Dixon, 'Abd al-Ameer (1969). The Umayyad Caliphate, 65–86/684–705: (A Political Study) (PhD). London: University of London, S.O.A.S.
- Forster, Regula (2017). Wissensvermittlung im Gespräch: Eine Studie zu klassisch-arabischen Dialogen. Islamic History and Civilization. Vol. 149. Leiden and Boston: Brill. doi:10.1163/9789004326729. ISBN 978-90-04-32670-5.
- Forster, Regula (2021). "Khālid b. Yazīd". In Fleet, Kate; Krämer, Gudrun; Matringe, Denis; Nawas, John; Rowson, Everett (eds.). Encyclopaedia of Islam, Three. doi:10.1163/1573-3912_ei3_COM_35436.
- Gutas, Dimitri (1998). Greek Thought, Arabic Culture: The Graeco-Arabic Translation Movement in Baghdad and Early 'Abbāsid Society (2nd-4th/8th-10th Centuries). London: Routledge. ISBN 9780415061339.
- Halleux, Robert (1996). "The Reception of Arabic Alchemy in the West". In Rashed, Roshdi (ed.). Encyclopedia of the History of Arabic Science. Vol. 3. London: Routledge. pp. 886–902. ISBN 9780415020633.
- Hillenbrand, Carole, ed. (1989). The History of al-Ṭabarī, Volume XXVI: The Waning of the Umayyad Caliphate: Prelude to Revolution, A.D. 738–744/A.H. 121–126. SUNY Series in Near Eastern Studies. Albany, New York: State University of New York Press. ISBN 978-0-88706-810-2.
- Kennedy, Hugh (2004) [1986]. The Prophet and the Age of the Caliphates: The Islamic Near East from the 6th to the 11th Century (Second ed.). Harlow: Longman. ISBN 978-0-582-40525-7.
- Kilpatrick, Hilary (2010). "ʿUmar ibn ʿAbd al-ʿAzīz, al-Walīd ibn Yazīd and their Kin: Images of the Umayyads in the Kitāb al-Aghānī". In Borrut, Antoine; Cobb, Paul M. (eds.). Umayyad Legacies: Medieval Memories from Syria to Spain. Leiden and Boston: Brill. pp. 63–88. ISBN 9789004184749.
- Lory, Pierre (1989). Alchimie et mystique en terre d'Islam. Lagrasse: Verdier. ISBN 9782864320913.
- Mabra, Joshua (2017). Princely Authority in the Early Marwānid State: The Life of ʿAbd al-ʿAzīz ibn Marwān (d. 86/705). Piscataway, NJ: Gorgias Press. ISBN 978-1-4632-0632-1.
- Madelung, Wilferd (1997). The Succession to Muhammad: A Study of the Early Caliphate. Cambridge: Cambridge University Press. ISBN 0-521-56181-7.
- Madelung, W. (2004). "al-Sufyānī". In Bearman, P. J.; Bianquis, Th.; Bosworth, C. E.; van Donzel, E. & Heinrichs, W. P. (eds.). The Encyclopaedia of Islam, Second Edition. Volume XII: Supplement. Leiden: E. J. Brill. pp. 754–756. ISBN 978-90-04-13974-9.
- Moureau, Sébastien (2020). "Min al-kīmiyāʾ ad alchimiam. The Transmission of Alchemy from the Arab-Muslim World to the Latin West in the Middle Ages". Micrologus. 28: 87–141. hdl:2078.1/211340.
- Robinson, Majied (2021). "Qurashi Marriage and the Roots of Revolt: The Rebellion of ʿAbd Allah b. Muʿawiya, 744–747". In Marsham, Andrew (ed.). The Umayyad World. Abingdon, Oxon and New York: Routledge. pp. 518–538. ISBN 9781138913509.
- Ruska, Julius (1924). Arabische Alchemisten I. Chālid ibn Jazīd ibn Muʿāwija. Heidelberg: Carl Winter. OCLC 928821937.
- Sezgin, Fuat (1971). Geschichte des arabischen Schrifttums, Band IV: Alchimie, Chemie, Botanik, Agrikultur bis ca. 430 H. Leiden: Brill. pp. 120–126. ISBN 9789004020092.
- Sirriya, Elizabeth (1979). "Ziyārāt of Syria in a "Riḥla" of 'Abd al-Ghanī al-Nābulusī (1050/1641–1143/1731)". The Journal of the Royal Asiatic Society of Great Britain and Ireland. 111 (2): 109–122. doi:10.1017/s0035869x00135543. S2CID 163434595.
- Stavenhagen, Lee (1974). A Testament of Alchemy. Being the Revelations of Morienus to Khālid ibn Yazīd. Hanover: Brandeis University Press. ISBN 9780874510959.
- Ullmann, Manfred (1978). "Ḫālid Ibn Yazīd und die Alchemie: Eine Legende". Der Islam. 55 (2): 181–218. doi:10.1515/islm.1978.55.2.181. S2CID 161171161.
- Ullmann, Manfred (1960–2007). "Khālid b. Yazīd b. Muʿāwiya". In Bearman, P.; Bianquis, Th.; Bosworth, C.E.; van Donzel, E.; Heinrichs, W.P. (eds.). Encyclopaedia of Islam, Second Edition. doi:10.1163/1573-3912_islam_SIM_4151.
- Wellhausen, Julius (1927). The Arab Kingdom and Its Fall. Translated by Margaret Graham Weir. Calcutta: University of Calcutta.
