= Umayyad dynasty =

Rulers of Umayyad Caliphate

Umayyad dynasty بَنُو أُمَيَّةَ الأمويون
- Parent family: Banu Abd Shams of Quraysh
- Country: Umayyad Caliphate (661–750); Umayyad state of Córdoba (756–1031)
- Origin: Mecca, Arabia
- Founded: 661
- Founder: Mu'awiya I
- Historic seat: Damascus; Córdoba
- Titles: Caliph (Umayyad Caliphate); Emir (Emirate of Cordoba); Caliph (Caliphate of Cordoba)
- Branches: Sufyanids; Marwanids

The Umayyad dynasty (Arabic: بَنُو أُمَيَّةَ, romanized: Banū Umayya, lit. 'Sons of Umayya'), or the Umayyads (Arabic: الأمويون, romanized: al-Umawiyyūn), were the ruling family of the second Islamic caliphate from 661 to 750 and the Umayyad state of Córdoba from 756 to 1031. They were the first hereditary dynasty in the history of Islam.

In the pre-Islamic period, the Umayyads were a prominent Arab clan of the Meccan tribe of Quraysh, descended from Umayya ibn Abd Shams. Despite staunch opposition to the Islamic prophet Muhammad, the Umayyads embraced Islam after the Conquest of Mecca in 630. Uthman ibn Affan, an early companion of Muhammad from the Umayyad clan, became the third Rashidun caliph, ruling from 644 to 656, while other members held various governorships. The Umayyad family established hereditary rule under Mu'awiya ibn Abi Sufyan, the long-time governor of Syria, who became caliph in 661 after emerging victorious in the First Fitna. Syria served as the metropolitan province of the Umayyad Caliphate thereafter, with Damascus as its capital.

Umayyad authority was later challenged in the Second Fitna, during which the Sufyanid line of Mu'awiya (which includes only the first three Umayyad caliphs) was replaced in 684 by Marwan ibn al-Hakam, who founded the Marwanid line that ruled until the fall of the Caliphate of Córdoba. His son and successor Abd al-Malik ibn Marwan would restore Umayyad control over the Caliphate after defeating the Zubayrids in 692. Abd al-Malik made key reforms to the administrative structure of the caliphate, including the centralization of caliphal power, the restructuring of the military, and policies of Arabization and Islamization within the bureaucracy.

The Islamic empire reached its largest geographical extent under the Umayyads, who were also the only dynasty to rule over the entire Islamic world of their time. The Umayyads advanced the early Muslim conquests, conquering the Maghreb, the Iberian Peninsula, Central Asia, Sindh, and parts of Chinese Turkestan, but the constant warfare exhausted the state's military resources, while revolts and tribal rivalries weakened the state from within. Finally, in 750 the Abbasids overthrew Caliph Marwan II and most of the Umayyad family were slain.

One of the survivors, Abd al-Rahman, a grandson of Caliph Hisham ibn Abd al-Malik, escaped to Muslim Spain, where he founded the Emirate of Córdoba, which his descendant, Abd al-Rahman III, transformed into a caliphate in 929. Under the Umayyads, al-Andalus became a centre of science, medicine, philosophy and invention during the Islamic Golden Age. The Caliphate of Córdoba disintegrated into several independent taifas in 1031, thus marking the political end of the Umayyad dynasty.

== History ==
=== Pre-Islamic origins ===
The Umayyads were a prominent clan of the larger Quraysh tribe, which dominated Mecca in the pre-Islamic era. The Quraysh derived prestige among the Arab tribes through their protection and maintenance of the Kaaba, which at the time was regarded by the largely polytheistic Arabs across the Arabian Peninsula as their most sacred sanctuary. A Qurayshite leader, Abd Manaf ibn Qusayy, who based on his place in the genealogical tradition would have lived in the late 5th century, was charged with the maintenance and protection of the Ka'ba and its pilgrims. These roles passed to his sons Abd Shams, Hashim and others. Abd Shams was the father of Umayya, the eponymous progenitor of the Umayyads.

Umayya succeeded Abd Shams as the qa'id (wartime commander) of the Meccans. This position was likely an occasional political post whose holder oversaw the direction of Mecca's military affairs in times of war, instead of an actual field command. This early experience in military leadership proved instructive, as later Umayyads would be known and recognized for possessing considerable political and military organizational capabilities. The historian Giorgio Levi Della Vida suggests that information in the early Arabic sources about Umayya, as with all the ancient progenitors of the tribes of Arabia, "be accepted with caution", but "that too great skepticism with regard to tradition would be as ill-advised as absolute faith in its statements". Della Vida asserts that since the Umayyads who appear at the beginning of Islamic history in the early 7th century were no later than third-generation descendants of Umayya, the latter's existence is highly plausible.

By circa 600, the Quraysh had developed trans-Arabian trade networks, organizing caravans to Syria in the north and Yemen in the south. The Banu Umayya and the Banu Makhzum, another prominent Qurayshite clan, dominated these trade networks. To secure these routes, they developed economic and military alliances with the nomadic Arab tribes that controlled the expanses of the northern and central Arabian deserts, gaining them commercial influence and a degree of political power in Arabia.

=== Opposition and conversion to Islam ===
The Islamic prophet Muhammad was a member of the Banu Hashim, a Qurayshite clan related to the Banu Umayya through their shared ancestor, Abd Manaf. When he began his religious teachings in Mecca, he was opposed by most of the Quraysh. He found support from the inhabitants of Medina and relocated there with his followers in 622. The Banu Abd Shams, which included the Umayyads, were among the principal leaders of Qurayshite opposition to Muhammad. They superseded the Banu Makhzum, led by Abu Jahl, as a result of the heavy losses that the Banu Makhzum's leadership incurred fighting the Muslims at the Battle of Badr in 624. The chief of the Umayyad clan, Abu Sufyan, thereafter became the leader of the Meccan Qurayshite army that fought against the Muslims under Muhammad at the Battle of Uhud and the Battle of the Trench.

Abu Sufyan and his sons, along with most of the Umayyads, embraced Islam towards the end of Muhammad's life, following the Muslim conquest of Mecca. To secure the loyalty of prominent Umayyad leaders, including Abu Sufyan, Muhammad offered them gifts and positions of importance in the nascent Islamic state. He installed the Umayyad Attab ibn Asid ibn Abi al-Is as the first Muslim governor of Mecca. Although Mecca retained its paramountcy as the center of the new religion, Medina continued to serve as the political center of Islam. Abu Sufyan and the Banu Umayya relocated to Medina to maintain their growing political influence.

Muhammad's death in 632 created a succession crisis, while nomadic tribes throughout Arabia that had embraced Islam discarded Medina's authority. Abu Bakr, one of Muhammad's oldest friends and an early convert to Islam, was elected as caliph (paramount political and religious leader of the Muslim community) and crushed the rebel Arabian tribes. Abu Bakr then showed favor to the Umayyads by awarding them a prominent role in the Muslim conquest of Syria. He appointed an Umayyad, Khalid ibn Sa'id ibn al-As, as commander of the expedition, but replaced him with other commanders, among whom were Abu Sufyan's sons, Yazid and Mu'awiya. Abu Sufyan had already owned property and maintained trade networks in Syria.

Abu Bakr's successor, Caliph Umar (r. 634–644), while actively curtailing the influence of the Qurayshite elite in favor of Muhammad's earlier supporters in the administration and military, did not disturb the growing foothold of Abu Sufyan's sons in Syria, which was all but conquered by 638. When Umar's overall steward over the province, Abu Ubayda ibn al-Jarrah, died in 639, he appointed Yazid governor of the districts of Damascus, Palestine and Jordan. Yazid died shortly after and Umar installed Yazid's brother Mu'awiya in his place. Umar's exceptional treatment of Abu Sufyan's sons may have stemmed from his personal respect for the family, their burgeoning alliance with the powerful Banu Kalb tribe as a counterweight to the aristocratic Himyarite tribes who dominated the Homs district, or due to the lack of a suitable candidate amidst the plague of Amwas, which had already killed Abu Ubayda and Yazid.

=== Empowerment by Caliph Uthman ===
Caliph Umar died in 644 and was succeeded by Uthman ibn Affan, a wealthy Umayyad merchant, early convert to Islam, and son-in-law and close companion of Muhammad. Uthman initially kept his predecessors' appointees in their provincial posts but gradually replaced many of them with Umayyads or his maternal kinsmen from their parent clan, the Banu Abd Shams. Mu'awiya retained his post under Uthman, who expanded his governorship to include the entirety of Syria. Two Umayyads, al-Walid ibn Uqba and Sa'id ibn al-As, were successively appointed to Kufa, one of the two main Arab garrison and administrative centers in Iraq. Uthman's cousin, Marwan ibn al-Hakam, became his chief secretary. Although a prominent member of the clan, Uthman is not considered part of the Umayyad dynasty because he was chosen by consensus (shura) among the inner circle of Muslim leadership and never attempted to nominate an Umayyad kinsman as his successor. Nonetheless, as a result of Uthman's policies, the Umayyads regained a measure of the power and influence they had lost after the Muslim conquest of Mecca.

The assassination of Uthman in 656 became a rallying cry for the Qurayshite opposition to his successor Ali ibn Abi Talib, Muhammad's cousin and son-in-law. Following their defeat at the Battle of the Camel near Basra, during which their leaders Talha ibn Ubayd Allah and Zubayr ibn al-Awwam, both potential contenders for the caliphate, were killed, the mantle of opposition to Ali was taken up chiefly by Mu'awiya. Initially, he refrained from openly claiming the caliphate, upholding the cause of avenging Uthman's death while focusing on undermining Ali's authority and consolidating his position in Syria. Ali's Iraqi army fought Mu'awiya's Syrian forces to a stalemate at the Battle of Siffin in 657. It was followed by an inconclusive arbitration, which weakened Ali's command over his forces, while raising the stature of Mu'awiya as Ali's equal. While Ali was encumbered with combating a faction of his former partisans, who became known as the Kharijites, Mu'awiya was formally recognized as caliph by his core supporters, the Syrian Arab tribes, at a ceremony in Jerusalem. When Ali was assassinated by the Kharijite dissident Ibn Muljam in 661, Mu'awiya invaded Iraq with his Syrian army and compelled Ali's eldest son and successor Hasan, who had been chosen as caliph in Kufa, to abdicate the caliphate to him. Mu'awiya then entered Kufa and received the pledge of allegiance from the Iraqis, with his suzerainty being acknowledged throughout the Caliphate.

=== Dynastic rule over the Caliphate ===
==== Sufyanid period ====
The reunification of the Muslim community under Mu'awiya's authority marked the establishment of the Umayyad Caliphate. Based on the accounts of the traditional Muslim sources, Hawting writes that:

The Umayyads, leading representatives of those who had opposed the Prophet [Muhammad] until the latest possible moment, had within thirty years of his death reestablished their position to the extent that they were now at the head of the community which he had founded.

In contrast to Uthman's empowerment of the Umayyads, Mu'awiya's power relied on the Arab tribes of Syria rather than on the Umayyad clan, and with minor exceptions, he did not appoint Umayyads to the major provinces or to his court in Damascus. He largely limited their influence to Medina, where most of the Umayyads lived. The loss of political power left the Umayyads of Medina resentful of Mu'awiya, who may have become wary of the political ambitions of the much larger Abu al-As branch of the clan, to which Uthman had belonged and which was by then led by Marwan ibn al-Hakam. Mu'awiya attempted to weaken the clan by provoking internal divisions. Among the measures taken was the replacement of Marwan from the governorship of Medina in 668 with another leading Umayyad, Sa'id ibn al-As. The latter was instructed to demolish Marwan's house, but refused. Marwan was restored in 674 and also refused Mu'awiya's order to demolish Sa'id's house. Mu'awiya appointed his own nephew, al-Walid ibn Utba ibn Abi Sufyan, in Marwan's place in 678.

In 676, Mu'awiya installed his son, Yazid I, as his successor. The move was unprecedented in Muslim politics, as earlier caliphs had been elected by popular support in Medina or by the consultation of the senior companions of Muhammad. Mu'awiya's Umayyad kinsmen in Medina, including Marwan and Sa'id, accepted Mu'awiya's decision, albeit disapprovingly. The principal opposition emanated from Husayn ibn Ali, Abd Allah ibn al-Zubayr, Abd Allah ibn Umar and Abd al-Rahman ibn Abi Bakr, all prominent Medina-based sons of earlier caliphs or close companions of Muhammad.

Yazid acceded in 680 and three years later faced a revolt by the people of Medina and Ibn al-Zubayr in Mecca. Yazid's cousin, Uthman ibn Muhammad ibn Abi Sufyan, and the Umayyads residing in Medina, led by Marwan, were expelled. Yazid dispatched his Syrian army to reassert his authority in the Hejaz and relieve his kinsmen. The Umayyads of Medina joined the Syrians in the assault against the rebels in Medina and defeated them at the Battle of al-Harra. The Syrians proceeded to besiege Mecca, but withdrew upon the death of Yazid. Afterwards, Ibn al-Zubayr declared himself caliph and expelled the Umayyads of the Hejaz a second time. They relocated to Palmyra or Damascus, where Yazid's son and successor, Mu'awiya II, ruled at a time when Umayyad authority over the Caliphate largely dissolved, with most provinces of the Caliphate acknowledging Ibn al-Zubayr as caliph

==== Early Marwanid period ====
The Umayyad Caliphate around 740

After Mu'awiya II died in 684, the junds of Palestine, Homs and Qinnasrin recognized Ibn al-Zubayr, while loyalist tribes in Damascus and Jordan scrambled to nominate an Umayyad as caliph. The Banu Kalb, lynchpins of Sufyanid rule, nominated Yazid's surviving sons Khalid and Abd Allah, but they were considered young and inexperienced by most of the other loyalist tribes. Marwan ibn al-Hakam volunteered his candidacy and gained the consensus of the tribes, acceding to the caliphate at a summit in Jabiya in 684. Per the arrangement agreed by the tribes, Marwan would be succeeded by Khalid, followed by Amr al-Ashdaq, the son of Sa'id ibn al-As. Marwan and the loyalist tribes, led by the Kalb, defeated Ibn al-Zubayr's supporters in Syria, led by the Qurayshite governor of Damascus, al-Dahhak ibn Qays al-Fihri, and the Qays tribes of Qinnasrin, and afterward retook Egypt. Before his death in 685, Marwan voided the succession arrangement, appointing his sons Abd al-Malik and Abd al-Aziz, in that order, instead. Abd al-Aziz was made governor of Egypt and another son, Muhammad was appointed to defeat the Qays tribes of the Jazira. Soon after Abd al-Malik acceded, while he was away on a military campaign, he faced an attempted coup in Damascus by Amr al-Ashdaq. Abd al-Malik suppressed the revolt and personally executed his kinsman. By 692, he defeated Abd Allah ibn al-Zubayr, who was killed, and restored Umayyad rule across the Caliphate.

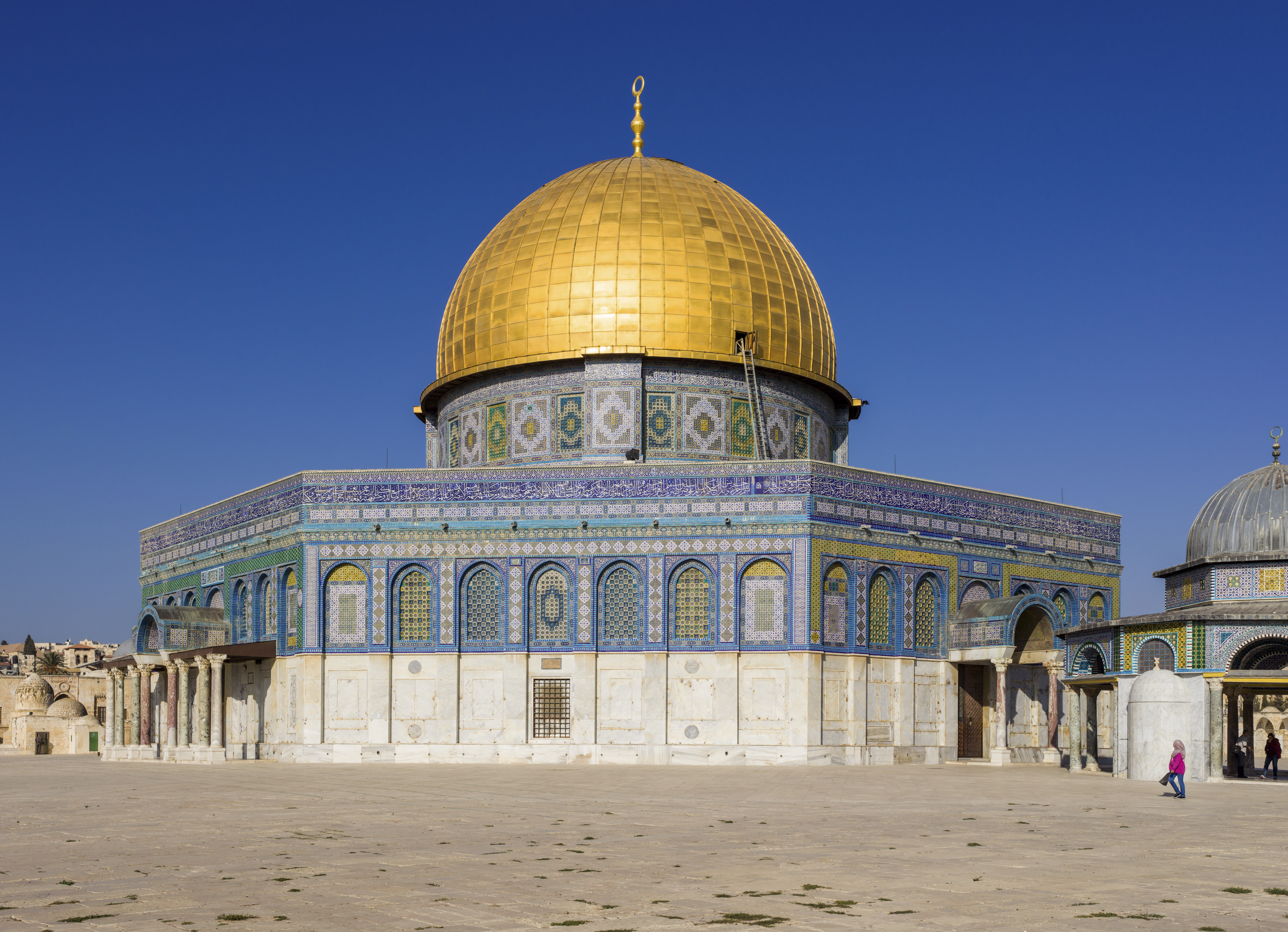
Dome of the Rock in Jerusalem, built by Caliph Abd al-Malik around 685–692

Abd al-Malik concentrated power into the hands of the Umayyad dynasty. At one point, his brothers or sons held nearly all governorships of the provinces and the districts of Syria. Abd al-Aziz continued to rule over Egypt until his death shortly before Abd al-Malik's in 705. He was replaced by Abd al-Malik's son Abdallah. Abd al-Malik appointed his son Sulayman over Palestine, following stints there by his uncle Yahya ibn al-Hakam and brother Aban ibn Marwan. In Iraq, he appointed his brother Bishr ibn Marwan over Kufa and a distant cousin, Khalid ibn Abdallah ibn Khalid ibn Asid, in Basra, before combining the governorships of both cities under the purview of his trusted general al-Hajjaj ibn Yusuf. Abd al-Malik's court in Damascus was filled with far more Umayyads than under his Sufyanid predecessors, a result of the clan's exile to the city from Medina. He maintained close ties with the Sufyanids through marital relations and official appointments, such as according Yazid's son Khalid a prominent role in the court and army and wedding to him his daughter A'isha. Abd al-Malik also married Khalid's sister Atika, who became his favorite and most influential wife.

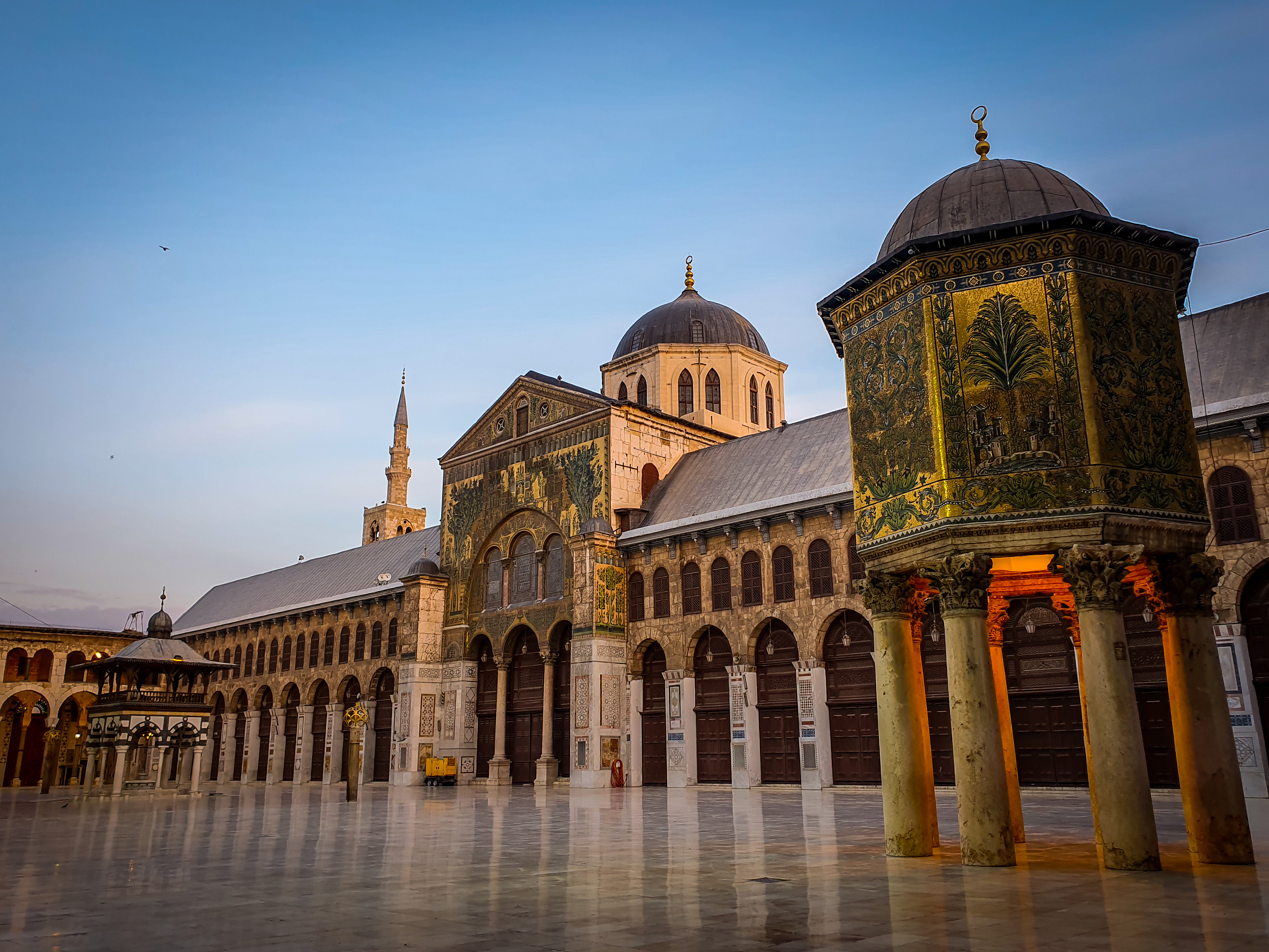
Great Mosque of Damascus in Syria, built by Caliph al-Walid I around 706–715

After his brother Abd al-Aziz's death, Abd al-Malik designated his eldest son, al-Walid I, his successor, to be followed by his second eldest, Sulayman. Al-Walid acceded in 705. He kept Sulayman as governor of Palestine, while appointing his sons to the other junds of Syria, with Abd al-Aziz over Damascus, al-Abbas over Homs and Umar over Jordan, as well as giving them command roles in the frontier wars against the Byzantines in Anatolia. He retired his uncle Muhammad ibn Marwan from the Jazira, installing his half-brother Maslama there instead. Al-Walid I's attempt to void his father's succession arrangements by replacing Sulayman with his son Abd al-Aziz failed and Sulayman acceded in 715. Rather than nominating his own sons or brothers, Sulayman appointed his cousin, Umar II, the son of Abd al-Aziz ibn Marwan, as his successor. While the traditional sources present the choice as related to the persuasion of the court theologian, Raja ibn Haywa, it may have been related to Umar II's seniority and his father's previous position as Marwan I's second successor. The family of Abd al-Malik protested the move, but were coerced into a compromise whereby Yazid II, the son of Abd al-Malik and Atika, would follow Umar II.

=== Rule over al-Andalus ===
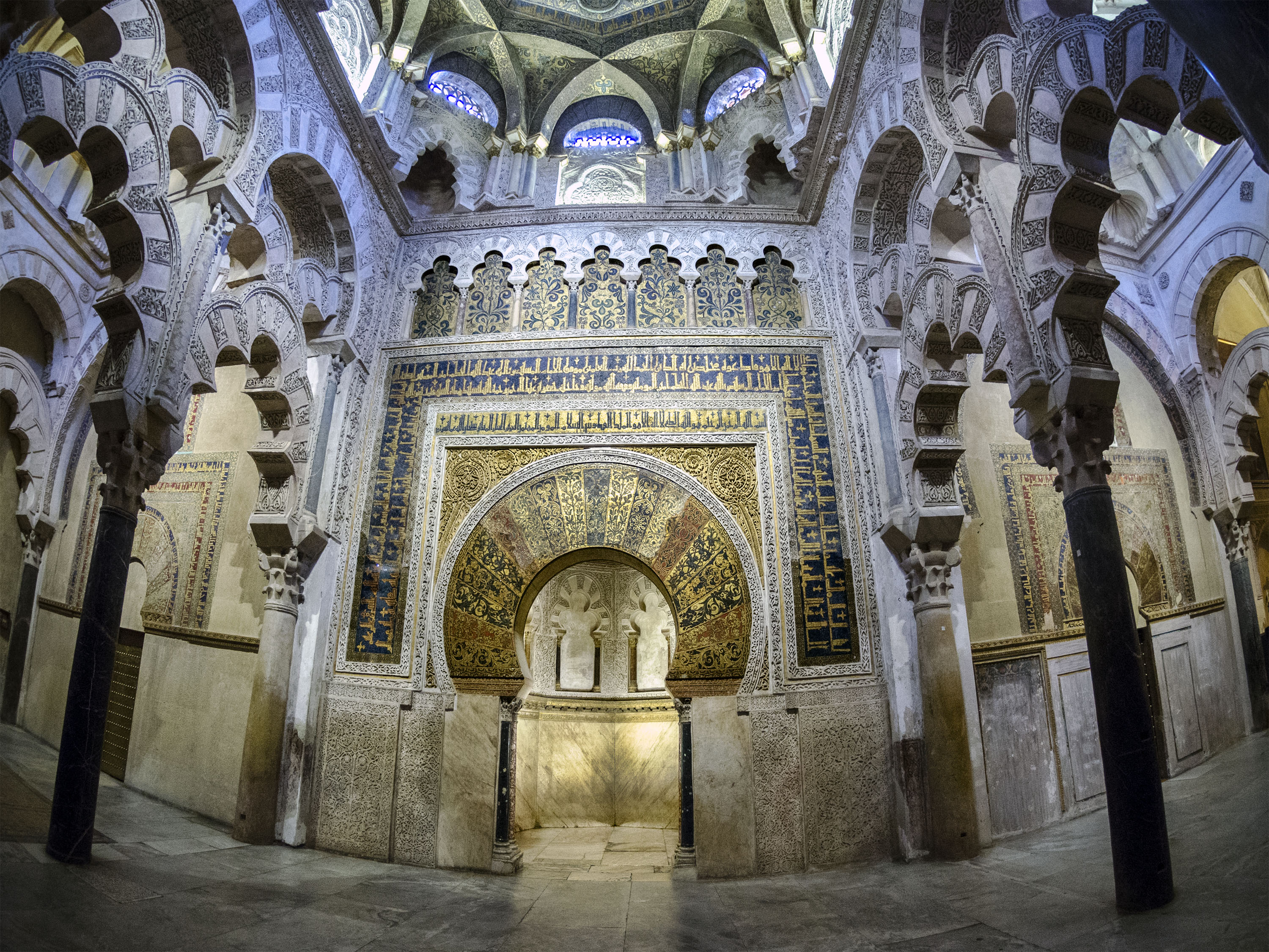
Great Mosque of Córdoba in Spain, originally built by Abd al-Rahman I in 785 and expanded by his successors.

Following the Abbasid revolution, Abd al-Rahman ibn Mu'awiya (better known as Abd al-Rahman I), a grandson of Caliph Hisham, made his way to al-Andalus (Islamic Spain), where the mawali of the Umayyads helped him establish a foothold in the province. Once he established the Emirate of Cordoba in 756, he invited other Marwanids, who were keeping a low profile under Abbasid rule, to settle in the Emirate. The 12th-century Andalusian poet al-Hijari quotes Abd al-Rahman stating: "among the many [favors] bestowed on us by the Almighty is his allowing us to collect in this country our kindred and relatives, and enabling us to give them a share in this empire". (Note: Among those who heeded Abd al-Rahman I's call to join him in al-Andalus were his brother al-Walid and the latter's son al-Mughira, his first cousin Ubayd al-Salam ibn Yazid ibn Hisham, and his nephew Ubayd Allah ibn Aban ibn Mu'awiya. Others who arrived included Juzayy, the son of Abd al-Aziz ibn Marwan, and Abd al-Malik ibn Umar (both grandsons of Marwan I from Egypt), Bishr ibn Marwan's son Abd al-Malik from Iraq, and al-Walid I's great-grandson Habib ibn Abd al-Malik, who had escaped the Abbasid massacre of Nahr Abi Futrus.)

The Umayyad immigrants were granted estates, stipends, command roles in the army, and provincial offices. The emirs, and later, caliphs of al-Andalus were direct descendants of Abd al-Rahman I. Families of Abd al-Rahman's more distant Umayyad relatives, namely Marwan I's grandson Abd al-Malik ibn Umar ibn Marwan (the Marwani clan) and al-Walid I's great-grandson Habib ibn Abd al-Malik (the Habibi clan) also attained prominence at the provincial, military, judicial and cultural levels into the 10th century. The Umayyads longed for the Levant, and they established in al-Andalus the same trees, plants and food crops which their ancestors had cultivated in Syria, serving the same traditional foods. Wholesale importation of Syrian styles of living contributed to an extensive Syrianization of the entire countryside of al-Andalus.

== Branches and descendants ==
In the early 7th century, prior to their conversion to Islam, the main branches of the Umayyads were the A'yas and the Anabisa. The former grouped the descendants of Umayya's sons Abu al-As, al-As, Abu al-Is and al-Uways, all of whom were born to the same mother and whose names shared the same or similar root, hence the eponymous label, 'A'yas'. The Anabisa, which is the plural form of Anbasa, a common name in this branch of the clan, gathered the descendants of Umayya's sons Harb, Abu Harb, Abu Sufyan Anbasa, Sufyan and Amr, who likewise had the same mother. Umayya had another son, Abu Amr Dhakwan, who was possibly adopted.

Two of the sons of Abu al-As, Affan and al-Hakam, each fathered future caliphs, Uthman and Marwan I, respectively. From the latter's descendants, known as the Marwanids, came the Umayyad caliphs of Syria who ruled between 684 and 750, and then the Cordoba-based emirs and caliphs of Muslim Spain, who held office from 756 to 1031. Other than those who had escaped to al-Andalus, most of the Marwanids were killed in the Abbasid purges of 750. However, a number of them settled in Egypt and Iran, where one of them, Abu al-Faraj al-Isfahani, authored the famous source of Arab history, the Kitab al-Aghani, in the 10th century. Uthman, the third Rashidun caliph, left several descendants (Uthmanids), some of whom served political posts under the Umayyad caliphs. The Uthmanids were largely concentrated in the Hejaz and maintained especially close ties with other Umayyads. An exceptional number of Uthmanids associated more with rival families and intermarried with the Abbasids, under whom some were installed as qadis in Medina. From the Abu al-Is line came the politically important family of Asid ibn Abi al-Is, whose members served military and gubernatorial posts under various Rashidun and Umayyad caliphs. The al-As line produced Sa'id ibn al-As, who served as one of Uthman's governors in Kufa.

The most well-known family of the Anabisa branch was that of Harb's son Abu Sufyan Sakhr. From his descendants, the Sufyanids, came Mu'awiya I, who founded the Umayyad Caliphate in 661, and Mu'awiya I's son and successor, Yazid I. Sufyanid rule ceased with the death of the latter's son Mu'awiya II in 684, though Yazid's other sons, Khalid and Abd Allah, continued to play political roles, and the former was credited as the founder of Arabic alchemy. Abd Allah's son Abu Muhammad Ziyad al-Sufyani, meanwhile, led a rebellion against the Abbasids in 750, but was ultimately slain. Abu Sufyan's other sons were Yazid, who preceded Mu'awiya I as governor of Syria, Amr, Anbasa, Muhammad and Utba. Only the last two left progeny. The descendants of Abu Amr were known as the Banu Abi Mu'ayt. Abu Amr's grandson Uqba ibn Abi Mu'ayt was captured and executed on Muhammad's orders during the Battle of Badr for his previous incitement against Muhammad. Uqba's son, al-Walid, served as Uthman's governor in Kufa for a brief period. The Banu Abi Mu'ayt made Iraq and Upper Mesopotamia their home.

The 10th-century geographer al-Hamdani held that several Umayyad groups inhabited the Upper Egyptian town of Tanda and its environs. Among those he counted were the families of Aban ibn Uthman (son of caliph Uthman) and Habib ibn (Umar ibn) al-Walid ibn Abd al-Malik, as well as another tribe descended from Marwan called the 'Marawna'. The Marawna still inhabit the regions of Qena, Sohag and Minya in Egypt today. Al-Hamdani notes these Umayyads were relatives of the Umayyads then in power in al-Andalus and that other Umayyads were scattered across the Maghreb and present in the Balqa region of Syria.

Banu Umayya (principle lines)

Umayya
Harb	Abu al-As	Al-As	Abu al-Is	Abu Amr
Abu Sufyan	Affan	al-Hakam	Banu Abi Mu'ayt
Sufyanids	Uthman	Marwan I
Uthmanids	Marwanids

Descendants of third Rashidun caliph Uthman (r. 644–656)
Ruling dynasty of Umayyad Caliphate, 661–680
Ruling dynasty of Umayyad Caliphate, 684–750

== See also ==
- Umayyad architecture
- Umayyad Mosque

== Sources ==
- Ahmed, Asad Q. (2011). The Religious Elite of the Early Islamic Ḥijāz: Five Prosopographical Case Studies. Oxford: University of Oxford Linacre College Unit for Prosopographical Research. ISBN 978-1-900934-13-8.
- Bacharach, Jere L. (1996). "Marwanid Umayyad Building Activities: Speculations on Patronage". Muqarnas Online. 13. Brill: 27–44. doi:10.1163/22118993-90000355. ISSN 2211-8993. JSTOR 1523250.
- Becker, C.H. (1960). "ʿAbd Allāh b. ʿAbd al-Malik". In Gibb, H. A. R.; Kramers, J. H.; Lévi-Provençal, E.; Schacht, J.; Lewis, B. & Pellat, Ch. (eds.). The Encyclopaedia of Islam, Second Edition. Volume I: A–B. Leiden: E. J. Brill. p. 42. OCLC 495469456.
- Bosworth, C.E. (1991). "Marwān I b. al-Ḥakam". In Bosworth, C. E.; van Donzel, E. & Pellat, Ch. (eds.). The Encyclopaedia of Islam, Second Edition. Volume VI: Mahk–Mid. Leiden: E. J. Brill. pp. 621–623. ISBN 978-90-04-08112-3.
- Caskel, Werner (1966). Ğamharat an-nasab: Das genealogische Werk des His̆ām ibn Muḥammad al-Kalbī, Band II [Jamharat al-nasab: The Geneaological Work of Hishām ibn Muḥammad al-Kalbī, Volume II] (in German). Leiden: Brill. OCLC 490272940.
- Crone, Patricia (1980). Slaves on Horses: The Evolution of the Islamic Polity (1980 ed.). Cambridge: Cambridge University Press. ISBN 978-0521229616.
- Donner, Fred M. (1981). The Early Islamic Conquests. Princeton, NJ: Princeton University Press. ISBN 0-691-05327-8.
- Della Vida, Giorgio Levi & Bosworth, C. E. (2000). "Umayya b. Abd Shams". In Bearman, P. J.; Bianquis, Th.; Bosworth, C. E.; van Donzel, E. & Heinrichs, W. P. (eds.). The Encyclopaedia of Islam, Second Edition. Volume X: T–U. Leiden: E. J. Brill. pp. 837–838. ISBN 978-90-04-11211-7.
- Donner, Fred M. (2012) [2010]. Muhammad and the Believers, at the Origins of Islam. Cambridge, MA: Harvard University Press. ISBN 978-0-674-05097-6.
- Eisener, R. (1997). "Sulaymān b. ʿAbd al-Malik". In Bosworth, C. E.; van Donzel, E.; Heinrichs, W. P. & Lecomte, G. (eds.). The Encyclopaedia of Islam, Second Edition. Volume IX: San–Sze. Leiden: E. J. Brill. pp. 821–822. ISBN 978-90-04-10422-8.
- Gibb, H.A.R. (1960). "ʿAbd al-Malik b. Marwān". In Gibb, H. A. R.; Kramers, J. H.; Lévi-Provençal, E.; Schacht, J.; Lewis, B. & Pellat, Ch. (eds.). The Encyclopaedia of Islam, Second Edition. Volume I: A–B. Leiden: E. J. Brill. pp. 76–77. OCLC 495469456.
- Hawting, G.R. (2000a). The First Dynasty of Islam: The Umayyad Caliphate AD 661–750 (2nd ed.). London / New York: Routledge. ISBN 0-415-24072-7.
- Hawting, G.R. (2000). "Umayyad Caliphate". In Bearman, P. J.; Bianquis, Th.; Bosworth, C. E.; van Donzel, E. & Heinrichs, W. P. (eds.). The Encyclopaedia of Islam, Second Edition. Volume X: T–U. Leiden: E. J. Brill. pp. 841–844. ISBN 978-90-04-11211-7.
- Kennedy, Hugh (1996). Muslim Spain and Portugal. A Political History of al-Andalus. London: Longman. ISBN 0-582-49515-6.
- Kennedy, Hugh N. (2002). "Al-Walīd (I)". In Bearman, P. J.; Bianquis, Th.; Bosworth, C. E.; van Donzel, E. & Heinrichs, W. P. (eds.). The Encyclopaedia of Islam, Second Edition. Volume XI: W–Z. Leiden: E. J. Brill. pp. 127–128. ISBN 978-90-04-12756-2.
- Kennedy, Hugh (2016) [1986]. The Prophet and the Age of the Caliphates: The Islamic Near East from the 6th to the 11th Century (Third ed.). Abingdon, Oxon and New York: Routledge. ISBN 978-1-138-78761-2.
- Kennedy, Hugh N. (2004). The Prophet and the Age of the Caliphates: The Islamic Near East from the 6th to the 11th Century (second ed.). Harlow, UK: Pearson Education. ISBN 0-582-40525-4.
- Lewis, Bernard (2002). Arabs in History. Oxford: Oxford University Press. ISBN 978-0-19-164716-1.
- Madelung, Wilferd (1997). The Succession to Muhammad: A Study of the Early Caliphate. Cambridge: Cambridge University Press. ISBN 0-521-56181-7.
- Al-Mughayri al-Lami, Abd al-Rahman ibn Hamad ibn Zayd (2019). المنتخب في ذكر نسب قبائل العرب [The Selected Lineages of the Arab Tribes] (in Arabic).
- Poonawala, Ismail, ed. (1990). The History of al-Ṭabarī, Volume IX: The Last Years of the Prophet: The Formation of the State, A.D. 630–632/A.H. 8–11. SUNY Series in Near Eastern Studies. Albany, New York: State University of New York Press. ISBN 978-0-88706-691-7.
- Scales, Peter C. (1994). The Fall of the Caliphate of Córdoba: Berbers and Andalusis in Conflict. Leiden / New York / Koln: Brill. ISBN 90-04-09868-2.
- Shaban, M.A. (1971). Islamic History: Volume 1, AD 600–750 (AH 132): A New Interpretation. Cambridge: Cambridge University Press. ISBN 978-0-521-08137-5.
- Watt, W. Montgomery (1986). "Kuraysh". In Bosworth, C. E.; van Donzel, E.; Lewis, B. & Pellat, Ch. (eds.). The Encyclopaedia of Islam, Second Edition. Volume V: Khe–Mahi. Leiden: E. J. Brill. pp. 434–435. ISBN 978-90-04-07819-2.
- Wellhausen, Julius (1927). The Arab Kingdom and Its Fall. Translated by Margaret Graham Weir. Calcutta: University of Calcutta.

— Imperial house — Umayyad dynasty Cadet branch of the Quraysh
Rashidun Caliphate as elective caliphate	Caliphate dynasty 661 – 6 August 750	Succeeded by Abbasid dynasty
Preceded by Umayyad dynasty as caliphal dynasty	Ruling house of the Emirate of Córdoba; 15 May 756 – 16 January 929	Emirate elevated to Caliphate
New title Proclaimed as Caliphate	Ruling house of the Caliphate of Córdoba; 16 January 929 – 1017	Succeeded by Hammudid dynasty
Preceded by Hammudid dynasty	Ruling house of the Caliphate of Córdoba; 1023–1025	Succeeded by Hammudid dynasty
Preceded by Hammudid dynasty	Ruling house of the Caliphate of Córdoba; 1026–1031	Caliphate dissolved into Taifa kingdoms
