= Al-Ashdaq =

Umayyad governor and general (died 689/690)

Abu Umayya Amr ibn Sa'id ibn al-As al-Umawi (Arabic: أَبُو أُمَيَّة عَمْرِو بْنِ سَعِيدِ بْنِ الْعَاصِ الأُمَوِيّ, romanized: Abū Umayya ʿAmr ibn Saʿīd ibn al-ʿĀṣ al-Umawī; died 689/90), commonly known as al-Ashdaq (Arabic: الأشدق), was a member of the Umayyad dynasty, general and a contender for the caliphal throne. He served as the governor of Medina in 680, during the reign of Caliph Yazid I (r. 680–683) and fought off attempts by the Zubayrids to conquer Syria in 684 and 685 during the reign of Caliph Marwan I (r. 684–685). The latter removed Yazid I's son Khalid and al-Ashdaq from the line of succession in favor of his own sons Abd al-Malik (r. 685–705) and Abd al-Aziz. Al-Ashdaq's attempted coup against Abd al-Malik in 689 ended with his surrender and his execution by Abd al-Malik.

== Life ==
Amr was the son of the Umayyad statesman Sa'id ibn al-As and Umm al-Banin bint al-Hakam, the sister of another Umayyad statesman, Marwan ibn al-Hakam. He was nicknamed al-Ashdaq ('the Widemouthed'). When Sa'id died in 679, al-Ashdaq became the leader of this branch of the Umayyad clan. At the end of the reign of Caliph Mu'awiya I (r. 661–680), he was governor of Mecca but was then appointed the governor of Medina at the accession of Caliph Yazid I (r. 680–683). When the Umayyads were driven out of Mecca during the revolt of Abd Allah ibn al-Zubayr in 682, al-Ashdaq was ordered by Yazid to send an army against the Zubayrids in the city. Al-Ashdaq appointed Ibn al-Zubayr's brother, Amr, to lead the expedition, but the force was defeated and Amr was executed by Ibn al-Zubayr. Toward the end of 683, al-Ashdaq was dismissed. Yazid died and was succeeded by his son Mu'awiya II. The latter was ill and died a few months later, causing a leadership crisis in the Umayyad Caliphate, during which most of its provinces recognized Ibn al-Zubayr as caliph.

When the pro-Umayyad Arab tribal nobility of Syria, chief among them the chief of the Banu Kalb, elected Marwan ibn al-Hakam as caliph at the Jabiya summit of 684, it was stipulated that Yazid's then-young son Khalid would succeed Marwan, followed by al-Ashdaq. The latter commanded the right wing of Marwan's army during the Battle of Marj Rahit later that year, in which the Umayyads scored a resounding victory over the pro-Zubayrid Qaysi tribes of Syria. Al-Ashdaq took part in Marwan's expedition to wrest control of Egypt from its Zubayrid governor in 685. After the Umayyad victory, al-Ashdaq proclaimed Marwan's sovereignty from the pulpit of the mosque in the provincial capital Fustat. Afterward, he was dispatched by Marwan to stave off an invasion of Palestine by Mus'ab ibn al-Zubayr, who tried to conquer Umayyad Syria in Marwan's absence. He then joined Marwan and took up residence in the Umayyad capital of Damascus. Marwan was wary of al-Ashdaq's ambitions to the caliphate, particularly due to their close kinship (Marwan was both a maternal uncle and paternal relative of al-Ashdaq) and his popularity among the Syrian Arab nobility. Marwan resolved to void the leadership bids of al-Ashdaq and Khalid by having his own sons Abd al-Malik and Abd al-Aziz, in that order, recognized by the Syrian nobility as his chosen successors.

Abd al-Malik succeeded his father in late 685. He was suspicious of al-Ashdaq, as the latter did not relinquish his caliphal claims and viewed Abd al-Malik's accession as a violation of the arrangements reached in Jabiya. When the caliph left Damascus on a military campaign against Zubayrid-held Iraq in 689, al-Ashdaq took advantage of his absence to launch a revolt, seize the city and declare his right as sovereign. This compelled Abd al-Malik to abandon his campaign and address al-Ashdaq's rebellion. In the ensuing standoff in Damascus between their supporters, Abd al-Malik offered al-Ashdaq amnesty in return for his surrender, to which al-Ashdaq obliged. Abd al-Malik remained distrustful of al-Ashdaq and had him summoned to his palace in Damascus, where he executed him in 689/90.

== Family ==
Al-Ashdaq's sons Umayya, Sa'id, Isma'il and Muhammad and daughter Umm Kulthum were all born to al-Ashdaq's wife Umm Habib bint Hurayth of the Banu Udhra tribe. The sons reconciled with Abd al-Malik after the latter's victory over the Zubayrids in 692. Sa'id, who had participated in his father's revolt, subsequently migrated to Medina, then to Kufa. He is later reported to have visited the court of the Umayyad caliph Yazid II in 724. Isma'il, who had also participated in his father's rebellion, lived in ascetic seclusion near Medina into the beginning of the Abbasid period (post-750) and the Umayyad caliph Umar ibn Abd al-Aziz (r. 717–720) reportedly considered appointing him his successor for his reputed piety. Amid the persecution of the Umayyad family in the aftermath of their overthrow by the Abbasids in 750, Isma'il was spared execution by the Abbasid governor of Medina Dawud ibn Ali.

From his wife Sawda bint al-Zubayr ibn al-Awwam, the sister of Abd Allah ibn al-Zubayr, al-Ashdaq had his sons Abd al-Malik and Abd al-Aziz and daughter Ramla. He was also married to A'isha bint Muti, the sister of Abd Allah ibn Muti from the Banu Adi clan of Quraysh, who had his sons Musa and Imran. From his Kalbite wife Na'ila bint al-Furays he had a daughter, Umm Musa. The latter was married to a son of Yazid I, Abd Allah al-Uswar. He also had children from two ummahat awlad (slave concubines), one of whom bore his sons Abd Allah and Abd al-Rahman and the other his daughter Umm Imran.

Descendants of al-As ibn Umayya

Umayya
Harb	Abu al-As	Al-As	Abu al-Is	Abu Amr
Sufyanids	Uthmanids	Marwanids	Sa'id (Abu Uhayha)	Banu Abi Mu'ayt
al-Hakam	Ubayda	Uhayha	al-As	Khalid	Aban	Amr
Sa'id
Aban	Yahya	Muhammad	Amr (al-Ashdaq)	Abdallah	Anbasa	Uthman
Sa'id	Sa'id	Sa'id	Abdallah	Isma'il	Umayya	Musa	Abd al-Rahman	Abdallah
Yahya	Muhammad	Isma'il	Amr	Imran	Ayyub	Muhammad (Abu Jabra)

Dashed line indicates skipped generation(s)
Italicized indicates other Umayyad families/lineages
Third Rashidun caliph Uthman (r. 644–656) and descendants
Ruling dynasty of Umayyad Caliphate, 661–684
Ruling dynasty of Umayyad Caliphate, 684–750

== Bibliography ==
- Ibn Sa'd, Muhammad (2000). Kitāb al-Ṭabaqāt al-Kabīr: The Mẹn ọf Madīna. Vol. 2. Translated by Aisha Bewley. Ta-Ha Publishers. ISBN 9781897940907.
- Blankinship, Khalid Yahya, ed. (1989). The History of al-Ṭabarī, Volume XXV: The End of Expansion: The Caliphate of Hishām, A.D. 724–738/A.H. 105–120. SUNY Series in Near Eastern Studies. Albany, New York: State University of New York Press. ISBN 978-0-88706-569-9.
- Bosworth, C. E. (1995). "Saʿīd b. al-ʿĀṣ". In Bosworth, C. E.; van Donzel, E.; Heinrichs, W. P. & Lecomte, G. (eds.). The Encyclopaedia of Islam, Second Edition. Volume VIII: Ned–Sam. Leiden: E. J. Brill. p. 853. ISBN 978-90-04-09834-3.
- Fishbein, Michael, ed. (1990). The History of al-Ṭabarī, Volume XXI: The Victory of the Marwānids, A.D. 685–693/A.H. 66–73. SUNY Series in Near Eastern Studies. Albany, New York: State University of New York Press. ISBN 978-0-7914-0221-4.
- Hawting, G. R., ed. (1989). The History of al-Ṭabarī, Volume XX: The Collapse of Sufyānid Authority and the Coming of the Marwānids: The Caliphates of Muʿāwiyah II and Marwān I and the Beginning of the Caliphate of ʿAbd al-Malik, A.D. 683–685/A.H. 64–66. SUNY Series in Near Eastern Studies. Albany, New York: State University of New York Press. ISBN 978-0-88706-855-3.
- Hillenbrand, Carole, ed. (1989). The History of al-Ṭabarī, Volume XXVI: The Waning of the Umayyad Caliphate: Prelude to Revolution, A.D. 738–744/A.H. 121–126. SUNY Series in Near Eastern Studies. Albany, New York: State University of New York Press. ISBN 978-0-88706-810-2.
- Landau-Tasseron, Ella, ed. (1998). The History of al-Ṭabarī, Volume XXXIX: Biographies of the Prophet's Companions and their Successors: al-Ṭabarī's Supplement to his History. SUNY Series in Near Eastern Studies. Albany, New York: State University of New York Press. ISBN 978-0-7914-2819-1.
- Robinson, Majied (2020). Marriage in the Tribe of Muhammad: A Statistical Study of Early Arabic Genealogical Literature. Berlin: Walter de Gruyter. ISBN 978-3-11-062416-8.
- Zetterstéen, K. V. (1960). "ʿAmr b. Saʿīd". In Gibb, H. A. R.; Kramers, J. H.; Lévi-Provençal, E.; Schacht, J.; Lewis, B. & Pellat, Ch. (eds.). The Encyclopaedia of Islam, Second Edition. Volume I: A–B. Leiden: E. J. Brill. pp. 453–454. OCLC 495469456.
