= Yazid ibn Abi Sufyan =

7th-century Arab military commander

Governor of Damascus, Jordan and Palestine
- In office 639
- Preceded by: Abu Ubayda ibn al-Jarrah
- Succeeded by: Mu'awiya ibn Abi Sufyan (over Damascus and Jordan)

Personal details
- Born: Mecca
- Died: 639
- Spouse: Fakhita bint Abd al-Rahman ibn Awf
- Relations: Banu Umayya (clan)
- Parent(s): Abu Sufyan ibn Harb; Zaynab bint Nawfal

Military service
- Allegiance: Rashidun Caliphate
- Branch/service: Army
- Rank: Field commander (634–639)
- Battles/wars: Battle of Hunayn (630); Muslim conquest of the Levant; Battle of Ajnadayn (634); Siege of Damascus (634–635); Battle of the Yarmuk (636); Siege of Jerusalem (637)

Yazid ibn Abi Sufyan ibn Harb ibn Umayya (Arabic: يزيد بن أبي سفيان بن حرب بن أمية, romanized: Yazīd ibn Abī Sufyān ibn Ḥarb ibn Umayya; died 639) was one of the principal commanders of the Muslim conquest of Syria from 634 until his death in the plague of Amwas in 639. Following the capture of Damascus around 635, he was placed in command of the city and its military district. After the death, during the same plague, of the overall Muslim commander of Syria, Abu Ubayda ibn al-Jarrah, in 639, he was appointed by Caliph Umar (r. 634–644) the governor of Damascus, Jordan and Palestine.

Yazid was the elder half-brother of Mu'awiya I, who was appointed as his successor over Damascus and Jordan by Umar and gradually became governor over all of Syria.

== Early life ==
Yazid was a son of Abu Sufyan, a chief of the Quraysh tribe of Mecca, belonging to the Umayya branch of its Banu Abd Shams clan. His mother was Zaynab bint Nawfal (also identified as Zaynab bint Hashim) of the Kinana tribe. He embraced Islam with his father and paternal half-brother Mu'awiya when the Islamic prophet Muhammad captured Mecca in 630.

Soon afterward, he fought alongside the Muslims against the Thaqif tribe and its nomadic allies at the Battle of Hunayn. He was among the Qurayshites who the Islamic prophet won over through his generosity, in his case receiving a present of one hundred camels and forty ounces of silver.

Yazid was married to Fakhita, a daughter of Muhammad's close companion Abd al-Rahman ibn Awf.

Sufyanid family tree

Caliph Uthman (r. 644–656)	Abu Sufyan	Prophet Muhammad
Amr	Hanzala	Yazid	Amr	Mu'awiya I	Anbasa	Utba	Muhammad	Ramla
Ramla	Abd Allah	Yazid I (r. 680–683)	Uthman	Al-Walid	Uthman
Abd al-Malik (r. 685–705)	Atika	Mu'awiya II (r. 683–684)	Khalid	Abd Allah	Abd Allah	Qasim	Yazid	Atika
Yazid II (r. 720–724)	Abd Allah	Harb	Yazid	Ziyad	Muhammad	Umm Yazid	Sulayman (r. 715–717)	Abda	Hisham (r. 724–743)
Al-Walid II (r. 743–744)	Ali	Abu Sufyan	Abu Sufyan	Hashim	Abbas	Yazid
Qasim	Sa'id	Mu'awiya
Uthman

Dashed line indicates marriage
Italicized indicates female
Sufyanid caliphs
Marwanid caliphs
Nominated successors to the caliph
Sufyanid claimants to the caliphate during Abbasid rule

== Commander and governor in Syria ==
Yazid was appointed by Rashidun caliph Abu Bakr (r. 632–634) as one of the main commanders of the Muslim conquest of Byzantine Syria, launched in 633 or 634. Yazid and his men, who reportedly numbered between 3,000 and 7,500, were initially dispatched to the Balqa region east and northeast of the Dead Sea.

In May 634 Yazid and the other main commanders, including Amr ibn al-As, Shurahbil ibn Hasana and Khalid ibn al-Walid, besieged and captured Bosra, the first major Byzantine town to fall to the Muslims in Syria. After their major victory against the Byzantines at the Battle of Ajnadayn, during which Yazid acted as lieutenant commander, he launched further operations in the Balqa. Among these was the capture of the Amman fort in 635.

Yazid took part in the siege of Damascus, beginning in 634. Following the fall of city in 635, or later in 637, Yazid became the deputy governor of Damascus under Abu Ubayda ibn al-Jarrah's overall command over the Muslims in Syria. From Damascus, according to some of the early Muslim sources, Yazid dispatched lieutenant commanders against various places, including Dihya ibn Khalifa of the Banu Kalb to Palmyra in the desert to the northeast and a certain Zahra of the Banu Qushayr to the Batanea plain in the Hauran region south of Damascus; the defenders of both places capitulated after negotiations. He later left Damascus to confront a Byzantine force led by a patrician, Theodore, sent by the Byzantine emperor Heraclius to recapture the city. Yazid was reinforced by Khalid and the Byzantines were defeated.

In the Battle of the Yarmuk in 636, where the Muslims scored a decisive victory against the Byzantines, which consolidated and extended their conquest of much of Syria, Yazid was one of the four principal Muslim field commanders. He and Mu'awiya also launched operations against the Syrian littoral, capturing the Mediterranean port towns of Sidon, Beirut and Byblos.

When Abu Ubayda died in the plague of Amwas in 639, Yazid was appointed by Caliph Umar (r. 634–644) as the governor of Damascus, Jordan and Palestine. The plague had afflicted much of Syria and took an enormous toll on the Muslim troops there. Later in 639, Yazid succumbed to the plague as well. He did not leave any children. Umar appointed Mu'awiya in his brother's place over Damascus and Jordan.

== Image ==
Yazid is referred to in later Islamic sources as 'Yazid al-Khayr' (Yazid the Good) because of his positively viewed role in the Syrian conquest. Because of the nature of his death during a state of war he is considered by these sources to be a shahid (martyr).

== Bibliography ==
- Ahmed, Asad Q. (2007). "Prosopography and Reconstruction of the Hijazi History for the Early Islamic Period: The Case of the Awfid Family". In Keats-Rohan, K. S. B. (ed.). Prosopography Approaches and Applications: A Handbook. Oxford: University of Oxford. ISBN 978-1-900934-12-1.
- Bosworth, C. E. (2002). "Yazīd b. Abī Sufyān". In Bearman, P. J.; Bianquis, Th.; Bosworth, C. E.; van Donzel, E. & Heinrichs, W. P. (eds.). The Encyclopaedia of Islam, Second Edition. Volume XI: W–Z. Leiden: E. J. Brill. p. 312. ISBN 978-90-04-12756-2.
- Caskel, Werner (1966). Ğamharat an-nasab: Das genealogische Werk des His̆ām ibn Muḥammad al-Kalbī, Volume II (in German). Leiden: Brill.
- Donner, Fred M. (2014) [1981]. The Early Islamic Conquests. Princeton: Princeton University Press. ISBN 978-0-691-05327-1.
- Hinds, Martin (1993). "Muʿāwiya I b. Abī Sufyān". In Bosworth, C. E.; van Donzel, E.; Heinrichs, W. P. & Pellat, Ch. (eds.). The Encyclopaedia of Islam, Second Edition. Volume VII: Mif–Naz. Leiden: E. J. Brill. pp. 263–268. ISBN 978-90-04-09419-2.
- Madelung, Wilferd (1997). The Succession to Muhammad: A Study of the Early Caliphate. Cambridge: Cambridge University Press. ISBN 0-521-56181-7.
