= Mu'awiya II =

Umayyad caliph from 683 to 684

Mu'awiya II مُعَاوِيَة بْنِ يَزِيد
- Amir al-Mu'minin
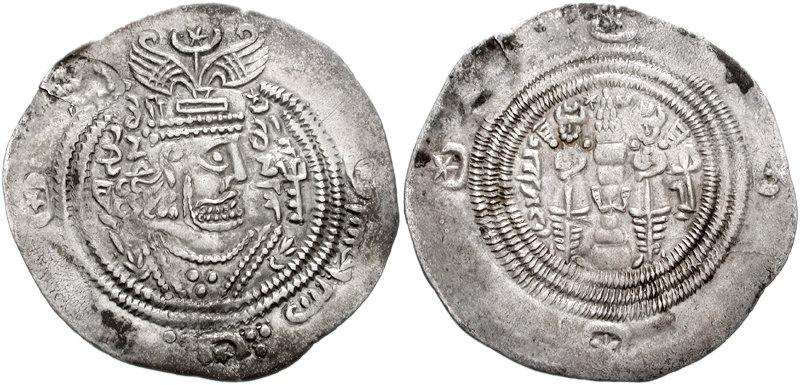
- Arab-Sasanian dirham of Mu'awiya II, struck at the Marw mint, dated AH 64 (683/4 CE)

3rd Caliph of the Umayyad Caliphate
- Reign: 683 – 684
- Predecessor: Yazid I
- Successor: Marwan I
- Born: c. 664 CE; Syria, Umayyad Caliphate
- Died: c. 684 CE (aged 19–20); Damascus, Umayyad Caliphate
- House: Sufyanid
- Dynasty: Umayyad
- Father: Yazid I
- Religion: Islam

Mu'awiya ibn Yazid ibn Mu'awiya (Arabic: مُعَاوِيَة بْنِ يَزِيد بْنِ مُعَاوِيَة, romanized: Muʿāwiya ibn Yazīd ibn Muʿāwiya; c. 664–684), commonly known as Mu'awiya II, was the third Umayyad caliph. The last ruler of the Sufyanid line, he succeeded his father Yazid I in 683 (64 AH) but died after a reign of only a few months.

Mu'awiya II's accession occurred during the Second Fitna, a period of civil war where his authority was largely limited to Damascus and southern Syria. His rival, Abd Allah ibn al-Zubayr, was recognized as caliph in the Hejaz and several other provinces. Mu'awiya II's brief tenure was marked by chronic ill health and minimal administrative activity, though he reportedly continued his father's policy of reducing taxes.

Historical accounts of his reign are often viewed as sectarian or unreliable. He is most famous for a provocative sermon recorded by Al-Ya'qubi, in which he allegedly denounced his predecessors and abdicated the throne. Because he died without heirs, his death triggered a succession crisis that eventually shifted power from the Sufyanid branch to the Marwanid branch under Marwan I. In later Islamic tradition, particularly within Sufism, he is remembered for his piety and perceived spiritual authority.

== Early life ==
Mu'awiya was born in Syria, the son of the Umayyad caliph Yazid I and an unnamed woman from the Banu Kalb tribe. His mother is often confused with Fakhitah bint Abi Hashim, the mother of Mu'awiya's half-brother Khalid ibn Yazid. His father, Yazid died on 11 November 683 in the central Syrian desert town of Huwwarin, his favourite residence, aged between 35 and 43, and was buried there.

== Reign ==
=== Accession and administration ===
Before Yazid I died, he had the bay'ah (allegiance) made to his son Mu'awiya. Mu'awiya succeeded his father in Damascus in 64 AH (November 683 CE), at an age of somewhere between 17 and 23. He was supported by the Kalb tribe, but his authority was likely only recognised in Damascus and southern Syria, with Abd Allah ibn al-Zubayr claiming the caliphate from his base in the Hejaz.

Mu'awiya's reign lasted between 20 days and four months, though most historians suggest a duration of no more than two months. Given this short span, few administrative events were possible, and he reportedly suffered from ill health throughout his tenure, remaining in the Khadra Palace in Damascus while his adviser Al-Dahhak ibn Qays al-Fihri managed practical affairs. What does seem certain is that Mu'awiya continued his father's policy and remitted a third of the taxes.

=== Succession crisis and alleged abdication ===
Because of the brevity of his rule, many accounts of Mu'awiya II's actions are considered by historians to be unreliable political or sectarian fabrications. These include his alleged membership in the Qadariyah and a public renunciation of his predecessors. In some traditions, he was mockingly given the kunya Abu Layla ("Father of Layla"), a name typically applied to weak individuals; the name was considered suspicious or derogatory as he had no children.

According to the account of the historian al-Ya'qubi, the Caliph delivered a provocative sermon from the minbar in which he explicitly abdicated his position. In this narrative, Mu'awiya II stated that his grandfather, Mu'awiya I, had struggled for power against one more entitled to it (Ali), and characterized his father Yazid I as having "pursued his desires" while lamenting his "evil downfall" in the afterlife due to the killing of the progeny of the Islamic prophet Muhammad and the burning of the Ka'ba.

"I am not the one to take charge of your affairs, nor the one to bear the claims you make. So do as you like; for, by God, if the world is a place of profit, we have obtained a share of it; and if it is an evil, then what the family of Abu Sufyan have obtained of it is sufficient."

== Death and legacy ==
Mu'awiya II died in Damascus shortly after his withdrawal from public life. His age at death is disputed because while many sources place him in his early twenties, the historian Al-Tabari cites a report stating he was only thirteen years and eighteen days old. It is unclear how he died, although jaundice and a plague have been named as potential causes.

While some sources record that his brother Khalid ibn Yazid led the funeral prayers, others name his kinsman Uthman ibn Muhammad ibn Abi Sufyan as the leader of the service. Because Mu'awiya II died without children and had not appointed a successor, Umayyad power temporarily collapsed. The campaigns against the revolt of Abd Allah ibn al-Zubayr came to a halt until the Marwanid branch of the family took control under Marwan I.

Despite the political chaos of his reign, Mu'awiya II later gained a reputation for piety in some mystical circles. In his Al-Futuhat al-Makkiyya, the Sufi philosopher Ibn Arabi claimed that Mu'awiya II was a "spiritual Pole" or Ghawth of his time. He ranked him among the few rulers in history to combine temporal power with high esoteric authority. This group included the Rashidun, who were the four "Rightly Guided" caliphs consisting of Abu Bakr, Umar, Uthman, and Ali. Ibn Arabi also included Umar ibn Abd al-Aziz in this elite spiritual ranking.

Sufyanid family tree

Caliph Uthman (r. 644–656)	Abu Sufyan	Prophet Muhammad
Amr	Hanzala	Yazid	Amr	Mu'awiya I	Anbasa	Utba	Muhammad	Ramla
Ramla	Abd Allah	Yazid I (r. 680–683)	Uthman	Al-Walid	Uthman
Abd al-Malik (r. 685–705)	Atika	Mu'awiya II (r. 683–684)	Khalid	Abd Allah	Abd Allah	Qasim	Yazid	Atika
Yazid II (r. 720–724)	Abd Allah	Harb	Yazid	Ziyad	Muhammad	Umm Yazid	Sulayman (r. 715–717)	Abda	Hisham (r. 724–743)
Al-Walid II (r. 743–744)	Ali	Abu Sufyan	Abu Sufyan	Hashim	Abbas	Yazid
Qasim	Sa'id	Mu'awiya
Uthman

Dashed line indicates marriage
Italicized indicates female
Sufyanid caliphs
Marwanid caliphs
Nominated successors to the caliph
Sufyanid claimants to the caliphate during Abbasid rule

== Bibliography ==
- Chodkiewicz, Michel (1993). Seal of the Saints: Prophethood and Sainthood in the Doctrine of Ibn 'Arabi [Le Sceau des Saints]. Islamic Texts Society. ISBN 978-0946621408.
- Lammens, Henri (1921). Le Califat de Yazid Ier (in French). Beirut: Imprimerie Catholique Beyrouth. OCLC 474534621.
- Gordon, Matthew S.; Robinson, Chase F.; Rowson, Everett K.; Fishbein, Michael, eds. (2018). The Works of Ibn Wāḍiḥ al-Yaʿqūbī: An English Translation. Vol. 3. Brill. ISBN 978-90-04-36416-5.
- Hawting, G. R., ed. (1989). The History of al-Ṭabarī, Volume XX: The Collapse of Sufyānid Authority and the Coming of the Marwānids: The Caliphates of Muʿāwiyah II and Marwān I and the Beginning of the Caliphate of ʿAbd al-Malik, A.D. 683–685/A.H. 64–66. SUNY Series in Near Eastern Studies. Albany, New York: State University of New York Press. ISBN 978-0-88706-855-3.
- Bosworth, C.E. (1993). "Muʿāwiya II". In Bosworth, C. E.; van Donzel, E.; Heinrichs, W. P. & Pellat, Ch. (eds.). The Encyclopaedia of Islam, Second Edition. Volume VII: Mif–Naz. Leiden: E. J. Brill. ISBN 978-90-04-09419-2.
- Lammens, Henri (1920). "Moʿâwia II ou le dernier des Sofiânides". Études sur le siècle des Omayyades. Beirut: Imprimerie Catholique. pp. 177–179.
- Demichelis, Marco (2021). Violence in Early Islam: Religious Narratives, the Arab Conquests and the Canonization of Jihad. Bloomsbury Publishing. ISBN 978-0-7556-3800-0.

Mu'awiya II Umayyad dynasty Born: c. 664 CE Died: c. 684
Preceded by Yazid I	Caliph of Islam; Umayyad Caliph; 683 – 684	Succeeded by Marwan I
