= Sa'id ibn al-As =

Muslim military leader and governor (died 678/679)

Saʿīd ibn al-ʿĀs سعيد بن العاص

Governor of Kufa
- In office 649–655
- Monarch: Uthman
- Preceded by: Al-Walid ibn Uqba
- Succeeded by: Abu Musa al-Ash'ari

Governor of Medina
- In office 669–674
- Monarch: Mu'awiya I
- Preceded by: Marwan ibn al-Hakam
- Succeeded by: Marwan ibn al-Hakam

Personal details
- Died: 678/79 Al-Arsa, near Medina, Umayyad Caliphate
- Spouse: Umm Amr bint Uthman ibn Affan; Maryam al-Sughra bint Uthman ibn Affan; Umm al-Banin bint al-Hakam ibn Abi al-As; Complete list: Umm Habib bint Jubayr ibn Mut'im; Juwayriyya bint Sufyan; Al-Aliyya bint Salama; Aisha bint Jarir ibn Abd Allah al-Bajaliyya; Umayma bint Amr al-Bajaliyya; Bint Salama ibn Qays; Umm Habib bint Buhayr; Umm Salama bint Habib
- Children: Amr al-Ashdaq Complete list: Uthman al-Akbar; Muhammad; Umar; Abd Allah al-Akbar; Al-Hakam; Dawud; Sulayman al-Akbar; Uthman al-Asghar; Mu'awiya; Aban; Khalid; Al-Zubayr; Abd Allah al-Asghar; Yahya; Ayyub; Sulayman al-Asghar; Ibrahim; Anbasa; Utba; Jarir; Amina (daughter); Umm Sa'id (daughter); Umayma (daughter); Umm Uthman (daughter); Ramla (daughter); Aisha al-Kabira (daughter); Hafsa (daughter); Aisha al-Saghira (daughter); Umm Habib al-Kabira (daughter); Umm Habib al-Saghira (daughter); Sara (daughter); Humayda (daughter); Umm Kulthum (daughter); Umm Dawud (daughter); Umm Sulayman (daughter)
- Parent(s): al-As ibn Abi Uhayha Sa'id; Umm Kulthum bint Amr

Sa'id ibn al-As ibn Abi Uhayha (Arabic: سعيد بن العاص بن أبي أحيحة, romanized: Saʿīd ibn al-ʿĀs ibn Abī Uḥayḥa; died 678/679) was the Arab Muslim governor of Kufa under Caliph Uthman (r. 644–656) and governor of Medina under Caliph Mu'awiya I (r. 661–680). Like the aforementioned caliphs, Sa'id belonged to the Umayyad clan of the Quraysh.

During his governorship of Kufa, Sa'id led military campaigns in Azerbaijan and near the Caspian Sea. However, he had to contend with dissent from some of the Kufan elite, led by Malik al-Ashtar. The dissent was largely driven by Sa'id and Uthman's policy of consolidating ownership of the productive Sawad lands of Iraq into the hands of the Quraysh and Muslim veterans from Medina. Sa'id had the dissidents exiled; however, in 655, while Sa'id was summoned to Medina for official consultations regarding the state of the caliphate, Kufan rebels led by Malik al-Ashtar seized control of the city and prevented his return.

After his ouster from Kufa, Sa'id aided in the defense of Uthman's house from attack by Egyptian rebels, but Uthman was killed nonetheless and Sa'id was wounded. He declined to fight alongside the Banu Umayya and Aisha against Caliph Ali (r. 656–661) during the First Fitna, an act for which he was favorably remembered in Islamic historiography. He was appointed governor of Medina by the Umayyad caliph Mu'awiya I in 669, but replaced by Marwan ibn al-Hakam in 674. Sa'id then retired to his estate outside the city where he died. One of his sons, al-Ashdaq, succeeded him as leader of his clan.

== Origins, early life and family ==
Sa'id was the only son of his father, al-As ibn Sa'id ibn al-As ibn Umayya, a pagan warrior of the Quraysh who was killed by Ali ibn Abi Talib as an unbeliever during the Battle of Badr in 624. Sa'id was only a young child when his father was slain, and by the time of the death of the Islamic prophet Muhammad in 632, he was approximately nine years old. The family belonged to the A'yas grouping within the Banu Umayya (Umayyads), a sub-clan of the Quraysh. His grandfather Abu Uhayha Sa'id ibn al-As (d. 622/23) was a ruler in Mecca and, in deference to his status among the Quraysh, was referred to as dhū al-tāj (owner of the crown) and no Meccan wore a turban the same color as his, though he was not a formal king. Sa'id's mother, Umm Kulthum bint Amr, was also a Qurayshite, and his maternal grandmother Umm Habib bint al-As was the sister of Abu Uhayha.

According to the historian Clifford Edmund Bosworth, Sa'id "speedily achieved great prestige in Islam not only as the leader of an aristocratic family group, but also for his liberality, eloquence and learning". He gained particular favor under his kinsman, Caliph Uthman (r. 644–656). Probably around 652–654, Uthman appointed Sa'id to help canonize the modern-day Qur'an, a task he shared with Abd Allah ibn al-Zubayr, Abd al-Rahman ibn al-Harith and Zayd ibn Thabit. Sa'id married two of Uthman's daughters, Maryam al-Sughra and Umm Amr. From the latter, he had his sons Dawud, Sulayman al-Akbar, Uthman al-Asghar, Mu'awiya and daughter Amina, while from Maryam al-Sughra he had his son Sa'id. Amina was married to Khalid, the son of Umayyad caliph Yazid I (r. 680–683). Nothing else is known about Sa'id's progeny with Umm Amr, except that Uthman al-Asghar's descendants settled in Kufa. Sa'id also married Umm al-Banin bint al-Hakam, a sister of Marwan ibn al-Hakam, another member of the Banu Umayya, who bore him his eldest son, Uthman al-Akbar, and sons Amr al-Ashdaq, Muhammad, Umar, Abd Allah al-Akbar and al-Hakam. (Note: Among Sa'id's other wives were Umm Habib bint Jubayr ibn Mut'im, Juwayriyya bint Sufyan and al-Aliyya bint Salama, Bint Salama ibn Qays, Umm Habib bint Buhayr, and Umm Salama bint Habib and two tribeswomen of the Bajila: Aisha, a daughter of the chief Jarir ibn Abd Allah, and Umayma bint Amr. Beyond his free-born wives, Sa'id fathered children with various unnamed ummahat awlad (slave women).) Sa'id's son Amr al-Ashdaq succeeded him as the head of his family. (Note: His other sons were Uthman al-Akbar, Muhammad, Umar, Abd Allah al-Akbar, al-Hakam, Dawud, Sulayman al-Akbar, Uthman al-Asghar, Mu'awiya, Aban, Khalid, al-Zubayr, Abd Allah al-Asghar, Yahya, Ayyub, Sulayman al-Asghar, Ibrahim, Anbasa, Utba, and Jarir. His daughters included Amina, Umm Sa'id, Umayma, Umm Uthman, Ramla, Aisha al-Kabira, Hafsa, Aisha al-Saghira, Umm Habib al-Kabira, Umm Habib al-Saghira, Sara, and Humayda.)

== Governor of Kufa ==
In 649/650, Sa'id was appointed governor of Kufa, replacing al-Walid ibn Uqba. During his tenure, his military reputation was boosted by campaigns in Azerbaijan and near the Caspian Sea. However, from the start, he faced issues with the Kufan elite, which comprised Arab tribal settlers, veterans of the Arab conquest of Mesopotamia, and the religious class known as the Qurra (Quran reciters). Many among the elite were incensed by Uthman's seizure of the conquered lands of the Sasanian royals and nobility in Iraq, which he planned to distribute to the tribesmen of Quraysh and certain men from Medina, in exchange for their properties in the Arabian Peninsula. Those two groups made up the early settlers in Kufa, who took part in the conquest of Iraq. By the time of Uthman, a large influx of newcomers from Arabia moved to Kufa and the Sawad, reducing the collective profits of the early settlers and prompting Sa'id to send a complaint about the crisis to Uthman in 651. Uthman's policy was meant to be a solution to this situation and stood in stark contrast to Caliph Umar (r. 634–644), under whom the Sawad lands were collectively held by the Muslim community. The newcomers were not able to benefit from the proposed land exchange since most did not own property elsewhere.

Sa'id pursued Uthman's policy and was reported to have stated that "the Sawad [of Iraq] is the garden of Quraysh", i.e. that the land was to be owned by his tribe. According to 8th-century historian Sayf ibn Umar, troubles came to a head when a certain young man of the Banu Asad, Abd al-Rahman ibn Hubaysh, remarked in the presence of Sa'id and the Kufan elite that Sa'id should take possession of the Sawad's lands. This aroused the anger of Malik al-Ashtar and the qurra. The young man's father insisted the remark was innocent, but Malik believed Sa'id had the event staged to justify the impending property confiscations. Ibn Hubaysh and his father were severely beaten, prompting the Banu Asad to besiege Sa'id's residence demanding retribution. Sa'id calmed the tribesmen and strongly condemned the actions of the qurra. With Uthman's sanction, the ten leading Kufan dissenters, including Malik, were exiled to Syria.

Uthman summoned Sa'id to Medina for consultations regarding the state of the caliphate in 655. During his absence, the qurra led by Malik al-Ashtar seized control of Kufa, preventing Sa'id from returning at the end of the year. Forced to return to Medina, he was replaced by Abu Musa al-Ash'ari, who was favored by the rebels.

== Later life and legacy ==
Sa'id took part in the defense of Uthman's house when it was besieged by Egyptian rebels in 656, sustaining wounds during the assassination. Although initially set to join Aisha, Talha ibn Ubayd Allah and Zubayr ibn al-Awwam in their pursuit of vengeance, he refused to fight against Caliph Ali at the Battle of the Camel and retired to Mecca. His neutral stance further facilitated his relations with the Banu Hashim; notably, he was chosen to lead the funeral prayer for Hasan ibn Ali upon the latter's death. Later, Caliph Mu'awiya I appointed him governor of Medina from 669 to 674.

Sa'id spent his final years at his estate in Wadi al-Aqiq, where he died in 678/679. His reputation remained unique among the Umayyads due to his refusal to fight Ali and his generally amicable relations with the family of Muhammad and Ali, earning him a favorable depiction in later Islamic historiography. His descendants remained prominent in the political landscape of the late 7th century: his son Amr al-Ashdaq became the family head before being executed in 689 for rebelling against Abd al-Malik. Sa'id's sons Yahya and Anbasa were also involved in this rebellion but were pardoned; Anbasa later served as a close aide to the viceroy al-Hajjaj ibn Yusuf.

Descendants of al-As ibn Umayya

Umayya
Harb	Abu al-As	Al-As	Abu al-Is	Abu Amr
Sufyanids	Uthmanids	Marwanids	Sa'id (Abu Uhayha)	Banu Abi Mu'ayt
al-Hakam	Ubayda	Uhayha	al-As	Khalid	Aban	Amr
Sa'id
Aban	Yahya	Muhammad	Amr (al-Ashdaq)	Abdallah	Anbasa	Uthman
Sa'id	Sa'id	Sa'id	Abdallah	Isma'il	Umayya	Musa	Abd al-Rahman	Abdallah
Yahya	Muhammad	Isma'il	Amr	Imran	Ayyub	Muhammad (Abu Jabra)

Dashed line indicates skipped generation(s)
Italicized indicates other Umayyad families/lineages
Third Rashidun caliph Uthman (r. 644–656) and descendants
Ruling dynasty of Umayyad Caliphate, 661–684
Ruling dynasty of Umayyad Caliphate, 684–750

== Bibliography ==
- Ahmed, Asad Q. (2010). The Religious Elite of the Early Islamic Ḥijāz: Five Prosopographical Case Studies. University of Oxford Linacre College Unit for Prosopographical Research. ISBN 978-1-900934-13-8.
- Anthony, Sean W. (2012). The Caliph and the Heretic: Ibn Sabaʾ and the Origins of Shīʿism. Leiden and Boston: Brill. ISBN 978-90-04-20930-5.
- Athamina, Khalil (1998). "The Tribal Kings in Pre-Islamic Arabia: A Study of the Epithet of Malik and Dhū al-Tāj in Early Arabic Traditions". Al-Qantara. 19 (1): 19–37. doi:10.3989/alqantara.1998.v19.i1.484.
- Ibn Sa'd, Muhammad (2000). Kitāb al-Ṭabaqāt al-Kabīr: The Men of Madina. Vol. 2. Translated by Aisha Bewley. London: Ta-Ha Publishers. ISBN 978-1-8979-4091-4.
- Bosworth, C. E. (1995). "Saʿīd b. al-ʿĀṣ". In Bosworth, C. E.; van Donzel, E.; Heinrichs, W. P. & Lecomte, G. (eds.). The Encyclopaedia of Islam, Second Edition. Volume VIII: Ned–Sam. Leiden: E. J. Brill. p. 853. ISBN 978-90-04-09834-3.
- Faris, Nabih Amin (2015). The Book of Idols: Being a Translation from the Arabic of the Kitab al-Isnam by Hishām ibn al-Kalbi. Princeton: Princeton University Press. ISBN 978-1-4008-7679-2.
- Madelung, W. (1997). The Succession to Muḥammad: A Study of the Early Caliphate. Cambridge University Press. ISBN 978-0-521-64696-3.
- Fishbein, Michael, ed. (1990). The History of al-Ṭabarī, Volume XXI: The Victory of the Marwānids, A.D. 685–693/A.H. 66–73. SUNY Series in Near Eastern Studies. Albany, New York: State University of New York Press. ISBN 978-0-7914-0221-4.
- Howard, I. K. A., ed. (1990). The History of al-Ṭabarī, Volume XIX: The Caliphate of Yazīd ibn Muʿāwiyah, A.D. 680–683/A.H. 60–64. SUNY Series in Near Eastern Studies. Albany, New York: State University of New York Press. ISBN 978-0-7914-0040-1.
- Rowson, Everett K., ed. (1989). The History of al-Ṭabarī, Volume XXII: The Marwānid Restoration: The Caliphate of ʿAbd al-Malik, A.D. 693–701/A.H. 74–81. SUNY Series in Near Eastern Studies. Albany, New York: State University of New York Press. ISBN 978-0-88706-975-8.
- Zetterstéen, K. V. (1960). "ʿAmr b. Saʿīd". In Gibb, H. A. R.; Kramers, J. H.; Lévi-Provençal, E.; Schacht, J.; Lewis, B. & Pellat, Ch. (eds.). The Encyclopaedia of Islam, Second Edition. Volume I: A–B. Leiden: E. J. Brill. pp. 453–454. OCLC 495469456.
- Wellhausen, Julius (1927). The Arab Kingdom and Its Fall. Translated by Margaret Graham Weir. Calcutta: University of Calcutta.

Preceded by Al-Walid ibn Uqba	Governor of Kufa; 649–655	Succeeded by Abu Musa al-Ash'ari
