= Abbasa bint Sulayman =

Abbasid princess and wife of Harun al-Rashid

Abbasa bint Sulayman العباسة بنت سليمان
- Zawjat al-khalifa

Wife of the Abbasid caliph
- Tenure: 804 – 809
- Born: c. 780s Baghdad, Abbasid Caliphate
- Died: 810s Baghdad, Abbasid Caliphate
- Burial: Baghdad
- Spouse: Harun al-Rashid (m. 803/804)
Names
- Abbasa bint Sulayman ibn Abdallah al-Mansur
- Dynasty: Abbasid
- Father: Sulayman
- Religion: Islam

Abbasa bint Sulayman (Arabic: العباسة بنت سليمان) was an Abbasid princess, daughter of Sulayman ibn Abi Ja'far, niece of Abbasid caliph al-Mahdi and wife of caliph Harun al-Rashid.

== Biography ==
Abbasa was the daughter of Abbasid prince Sulayman and a wife of Caliph Harun al-Rashid (r. 786–809) She marriage Harun al-Rashid around 803–804.

Her father, Sulayman was a son of the Abbasid caliph al-Mansur (r. 754–775) and one of his wives, Fatima bint Muhammad, granddaughter of Isa ibn Talha al-Taymi, who was the son of a leading companion of the Islamic prophet Muhammad, Talha ibn Ubaydallah.

Abbasa was related to Abbasid house both by birth and marriage. She was the third and last Abbasid princess who married Harun al-Rashid. His first Abbasid wife was Zubaidah bint Ja'far and second was Umm Muhammad bint Salih.

Her husband, Harun's another wife was Jurashiyyah al-Uthmanniyah. She was the daughter of Abdallah ibn Muhammad, and had descended from Uthman, the third Caliph of the Rashidun.

== Family ==
Abbasa was contemporary and related to several Abbasid caliphs, prince and princesses. Her own children died at very young age, she kept good relations with her step-son children.

No.	Abbasids	Relation
1	Harun al-Rashid	Husband
2	Al-Amin	Step-son
3	Al-Ma'mun	Step-son
4	Al-Qasim ibn Harun al-Rashid	Step-son
5	Ali ibn Harun al-Rashid	Step-son
6	Sukaynah bint Harun al-Rashid	Step-daughter
7	Hamdunah bint Harun al-Rashid	Step-daughter
8	Fatimah bint Harun al-Rashid	Step-daughter

== Sources ==
- Abbott, Nabia (1946). Two Queens of Baghdad: Mother and Wife of Hārūn Al Rashīd. University of Chicago Press. ISBN 978-0-86356-031-6.
- Kennedy, Hugh, ed. (1990). The History of al-Ṭabarī, Volume XXIX: Al-Mansūr and al-Mahdī, A.D. 763–786/A.H. 146–169. SUNY Series in Near Eastern Studies. Albany, New York: State University of New York Press. ISBN 978-0-7914-0142-2.
- Madelung, Wilferd (2000). "Abūʾl ʿAmayṭar the Sufyānī". Jerusalem Studies in Arabic and Islam. 24: 327–343.
- al-Tabari, Muhammad Ibn Yarir (1989). The History of al-Tabari Vol. 30: The 'Abbasid Caliphate in Equilibrium: The Caliphates of Musa al-Hadi and Harun al-Rashid A.D. 785-809/A.H. 169-193. Bibliotheca Persica. Translated by C. E. Bosworth. State University of New York Press. ISBN 978-0-88706-564-4.
