= Abu al-Umaytir al-Sufyani =

9th-century rebel during Abbasid era (811–813)

Abū al-Ḥasan ʿAlī ibn ʿAbd Allāh ibn Khālid ibn Yazīd ibn Muʿāwiya ibn Abī Sufyān (Arabic: أبو الحسن علي بن عبد الله بن خالد بن يزيد بن معاوية بن أبي سفيان), better known as Abū al-ʿUmayṭir al-Sufyānī (أبو العميطر السفياني), was an Umayyad rebel and self-proclaimed messiah who opposed Abbasid rule in Syria during the Fourth Fitna and, in 811, attempted to restore the Umayyad Caliphate, which had been toppled by the Abbasids in 750. He expelled the Abbasid governor of Syria, Sulayman ibn Abi Ja'far, from Damascus and set up a quasi-administration in the city. His claim to the caliphate soon after gained recognition in different parts of the Damascus, Homs and Qinnasrin districts, including the port of Sidon and city of Homs.

Abu al-Umaytir's support base consisted of the Banu Kalb, historically associated with his Sufyanid branch of the Umayyad family, and the wider Yaman tribal group, which put him at odds with the Yaman's rivals, the Qays. Persecution of the Qays in Damascus led to a campaign by the Qaysi chief and Abbasid loyalist, Ibn Bayhas al-Kilabi, to unseat Abu al-Umaytir. Using another Umayyad, Maslama ibn Ya'qub al-Marwani, as his proxy, his Qaysi fighters defeated and arrested Abu al-Umaytir in late 812 or early 813. Maslama claimed the caliphate for himself, leading Ibn Bayhas to depose him in late 813. Abu al-Umaytir and Maslama escaped Damascus and, with the Kalb's protection, held out in the Ghouta gardens around the city against attempts by Ibn Bayhas to capture them. Abu al-Umaytir died a natural death and his supporters flocked to another Umayyad claimant to the caliphate, Sa'id ibn Khalid al-Faddayni, whose suppression by Ibn Bayhas marked the last major attempt to reinstate Umayyad rule in Syria.

== Life and ancestry ==
Abu al-Umaytir (Note: He gained this nickname during a gathering in which he and his friends discussed the kunyas (paedonymics) of various animals; after he revealed to them that the kunya of the desert lizard was 'Abu al-Umaytir', he became popularly known by the name, despite his disapproval.) was a descendant of caliphs Yazid I (r. 680–683) and Mu'awiya I (r. 661–680), who belonged to the Sufyanid branch of the Umayyad dynasty, which founded and ruled the Umayyad Caliphate from 661 to 684. Abu al-Umaytir's grandfather, Khalid ibn Yazid, was a one-time claimant to the Umayyad throne, which instead fell to a different branch of the Umayyad family, the Marwanids, who held power until the dynasty's overthrow by the Abbasids in 750. His mother, Nafisa bint Ubayd Allah ibn al-Abbas, was a great-granddaughter of the fourth caliph, Ali (r. 656–661). Abu al-Umaytir styled himself ibn shaykhay Siffin (lit. 'the son of the two leaders of Siffin'), a reference to the consequential Battle of Siffin in 657 where Ali and Mu'awiya fought to a stalemate in the First Fitna.

Abu al-Umaytir was probably born during the reign of the Umayyad caliph Hisham ibn Abd al-Malik (r. 724–743). He was relatively wealthy and owned two houses, one in the Rahbat al-Zabib or Rahbat al-Basal neighborhood of Damascus and the other at his estate in the village of Mezzeh in the Ghouta gardens region, which surrounded the city. Mezzeh was a stronghold of the Banu Kalb tribe, old allies of the Sufyanids who were known as the family's akhwal (maternal uncles) due to their marital ties to caliphs Mu'awiya and Yazid. A learned man of reputable character and prestigious lineage, Abu al-Umaytir transmitted hadiths (traditions attributed to the Islamic prophet Muhammad and his companions) and historical events to pupils in the Great Umayyad Mosque of Damascus. He was reported to have given the mufti of Damascus a book of hadiths he compiled, but the mufti burned them in protest at Abu al-Umaytir's later claim to the caliphate. At one point, he was a visitor to the court of the Abbasid caliph al-Mahdi (r. 775–785) in Baghdad.

== Rebellion ==
=== Background ===
In the aftermath of the Abbasid Revolution, Umayyad princes were rounded up throughout Syria and executed, while the graves of the Umayyad caliphs were exhumed, all part of the new ruling dynasty's effort to extinguish their predecessors. Nonetheless, many Umayyads survived and continued to reside in Syria, the metropolitan province of their former caliphate and their traditional power base. Under the Abbasids, political and military power shifted to Iraq and the eastern Caliphate, with Syria becoming a neglected province whose inhabitants were viewed with suspicion by the authorities. The Umayyads and their backers in Syria aspired to restore the Umayyad Caliphate and presented a persistent threat to the Abbasid caliphs for several decades into their rule.

In 750, an Umayyad prince, Abu Muhammad al-Sufyani, grandson of Khalid ibn Yazid's brother Abd Allah al-Uswar, led a revolt against the Abbasids with the support of the two main tribo-political factions of Syria, the Yaman and the Qays. Until that point, the Yaman and the Qays had been locked in a decades-old rivalry for power in the Umayyad court and military, but both stood to lose their privileged position under the Iraq-based Abbasids. Abu Muhammad's revolt was stamped out and he fled Syria to the Hejaz (western Arabia) where he was eventually killed. Other Umayyad princes, such as the Sufyanids, al-Abbas ibn Muhammad and Hashim ibn Yazid, and a grandson of Caliph Hisham, Aban ibn Mu'awiya, led revolts against the Abbasids in Syria and along the Islamic–Byzantine frontier around 750, but they were also suppressed.

Two years after the death of the Abbasid caliph Harun al-Rashid in 809, the conflict over his succession between his sons al-Amin and al-Ma'mun culminated in a widescale civil war known as the Fourth Fitna. The war caused a power vacuum in the western provinces of the Caliphate, including Syria, where many among the Qaysi and Yamani tribal nobility threw off allegiance to the Abbasids and the local leaders of cities throughout the province expelled their Abbasid deputies. In the countryside, communities became prey to bandits and tribes known as Zawaqil. The power vacuum presented an opportunity for the Umayyads to stake their claim to power in Syria. The pro-Umayyad faction in Damascus, which consisted of Umayyad clan members, affiliated mawali (non-Arab clients or freedmen), Kalbi and other Yamani tribesmen, as well as Qaysi tribal chiefs and scholars, secretly spread prophecies about the imminent coming of the Sufyani, a messianic figure from the Sufyanid family, who would deliver Syria from the Iraqi Abbasids. The Umayyads had wide support among the Arab tribes, with the prominent exception of Ibn Bayhas al-Kilabi, a Qaysi stalwart and known Abbasid loyalist. To neutralize his potential opposition, they helped convince the Damascus-based governor-general of Syria, the Abbasid prince Sulayman ibn Abi Ja'far, to imprison him.

=== Claim to the caliphate and rule from Damascus ===
By this point, Abu al-Umaytir was eighty or ninety years old. He was approached by pro-Umayyad figures, such as Ibn Wajh al-Fals, the son of a mawla of Caliph al-Walid I (r. 705–715), to take up the mantle of leadership of the rebellion. They persuaded Abu al-Umaytir that he was the Sufyani messiah, a role which, after some reported hesitation, Abu al-Umaytir "used adeptly ... to great advantage" among the Syrians, according to the historian Paul M. Cobb.

The pro-Umayyad rebels attacked the palace of Sulayman ibn Abi Ja'far, who escaped to Iraq with the help of Ibn Bayhas. Abu al-Umaytir proceeded to seize the Khadra Palace, built by his ancestor Mu'awiya, and use it as his government residence. Oaths of allegiance to him as caliph were gathered by his supporters from the people of Damascus and he set up a quasi-administration. He appointed as qadi (head judge) the well-known hadith scholar Abu Mushir, a scion of the Ghassanids with a reputation of disdain for the Iraqis. Abu al-Umaytir and the Sufyanids' popularity among the Kalb and the Yamani tribes helped them quickly gain the allegiance of the Syrian cities and regions dominated by these tribal groups, such as Homs, whose leaders had expelled the Abbasids in the previous year. The Yamanis of Qinnasrin, such as the Tanukh tribe, also recognized him. The allegiance of the Syrian coastal towns, starting with Sidon, was secured by the son of Ibn al-Wajh, who expelled the Abbasid representatives from there, though the port city of Tripoli held out for the Abbasids.

The Yamani tribes, who formed the core of Abu al-Umaytir's forces, proceeded to persecute their Qaysi counterparts in Damascus, whose support for Abu al-Umaytir was less enthusiastic. The lukewarm response or rejection of Qaysi tribes and figures eventually led Abu al-Umaytir to suppress them. The Qaysi Banu Sulaym tribe in Hurjulla, a village near the city, were attacked and their village plundered by Abu al-Umaytir and the Yamanis when they refused to give their allegiance to him. Afterward, Abu al-Umaytir, the Qurayshites (the tribe to which the Umayyads and Abbasids belonged) and the Yamanis went on a rampage against the Qays inside Damascus, burning down their homes.

The Qays reached out to Ibn Bayhas for support, who responded by mobilizing his Dibab and Numayr tribesmen and mawali in the Hauran to assault Abu al-Umaytir in Damascus. Abu al-Umaytir, hearing of their approach, dispatched his Umayyad kinsman, Yazid ibn Hisham, to attack them in the Hauran. The Qays were routed and dispersed, but Yazid's army took a blow when they were assaulted by local villagers or Bedouins on their return to Damascus. This boosted the morale of Ibn Bayhas, who rallied the Qays to renew their campaign. From their encampments in the Ghouta, they besieged Damascus. Abu al-Umaytir called on his supporters to relieve the city, spurring a huge number of friendly troops from Sidon, Baalbek and the Beqaa Valley to reinforce him. Under the command of his son, al-Qasim, and Ibn Wajh al-Fals, these troops engaged Ibn Bayhas's forces. Both sides suffered heavy losses in a lengthy battle, which ended with al-Qasim's death and Ibn Bayhas retreating to the Hauran. The death of his son provoked Abu al-Umaytir into ordering his troops under his mawla, al-Mu'tamir ibn Musa, to pursue Ibn Bayhas. Although they gained an early advantage, Qaysi reinforcements saved Ibn Bayhas and in the ensuing fight, al-Mu'tamir was slain and the pro-Umayyad troops were put to flight. This defeat marked a turning point, in which Abu al-Umaytir's position in Damascus was dealt an unrecoverable blow.

=== Arrest, flight and death ===
Ibn Bayhas was too ill to pursue the campaign, but set up another Umayyad, Maslama ibn Ya'qub, from the historically Qaysi-friendly Marwanid branch which ruled the Caliphate from 684 to 750, to lead the Qays against Abu al-Umaytir. With the Numayr and his kinsmen and mawali, Maslama led an assault against the Green Palace and arrested Abu al-Umaytir. This most likely occurred in late 812 or early 813. He then summoned the Umayyads in the city, forcing them to pledge allegiance to him as caliph. With Maslama's sanction, the Qays overturned the Yaman's dominance of the area, taking over the Marj, a belt of pasture grounds surrounding the Ghouta, and restoring and seizing residences throughout the city. Ibn Bayhas became suspicious of Maslama's ambitions, and Maslama likewise became wary of Ibn Bayhas upon hearing of his recovery. Maslama's Qaysi followers attacked Ibn Bayhas upon his arrival before the city gates, but after the fighting, Qaysi tribal solidarity compelled most of Maslama's troops to defect to Ibn Bayhas. Ibn Bayhas entered Damascus in September 813, too quickly for Maslama's remaining troops to organize a defense. The pro-Umayyad troops retreated to the Green Palace, where Maslama released Abu al-Umaytir before both escaped dressed as women through the Bab al-Jabiya gate to the Kalb stronghold of Mezzeh.

Backed by the Kalb in the Ghouta villages of Mezzeh, Beit Lihya and Darayya, Abu al-Umaytir and Maslama held out against Ibn Bayhas, who was recognized governor of Damascus by the Abbasids. Maslama died a natural death and Abu al-Umaytir led the funeral prayers. Not long after, Abu al-Umaytir died of old age and was buried in a secret location by his supporters, who feared the Abbasids would desecrate his grave as they done to the graves of the Umayyad caliphs after they took over Syria in 750. His supporters later rallied under another Umayyad rebel and claimant to the caliphate, Sa'id ibn Khalid al-Faddayni, a descendant of Caliph Uthman (r. 644–656), who was based in the Balqa (in Transjordan). The suppression of al-Faddayni's revolt by Ibn Bayhas signaled the end to the last major attempt to resurrect the Umayyad Caliphate in Syria.

Family tree of Umayyad claimants to the caliphate during the Fourth Muslim Civil War

Umayya
Abu al-As	Harb
al-Hakam	Affan	Abu Sufyan
Marwan I (r. 684–685)	Uthman (r. 644–656)	Mu'awiya I (r. 661–680)
Abd al-Malik (r. 685–705)	Amr	Yazid I (r. 680–683)
Maslama	Abd Allah	Khalid	Abd Allah (al-Uswar)
Sa'id	Muhammad	Abd Allah	Ziyad (Abu Muhammad)
Muhammad	Khalid	Ali (Abu al-Umaytir)
Ali	Sa'id (al-Faddayni)	al-Qasim
Ya'qub
Maslama

Umayyad rebel claimants to the caliphate during the Fourth Fitna
Sufyanid caliphs
Marwanid caliphs
Caliph Uthman

Sufyanid family tree

Caliph Uthman (r. 644–656)	Abu Sufyan	Prophet Muhammad
Amr	Hanzala	Yazid	Amr	Mu'awiya I	Anbasa	Utba	Muhammad	Ramla
Ramla	Abd Allah	Yazid I (r. 680–683)	Uthman	Al-Walid	Uthman
Abd al-Malik (r. 685–705)	Atika	Mu'awiya II (r. 683–684)	Khalid	Abd Allah	Abd Allah	Qasim	Yazid	Atika
Yazid II (r. 720–724)	Abd Allah	Harb	Yazid	Ziyad	Muhammad	Umm Yazid	Sulayman (r. 715–717)	Abda	Hisham (r. 724–743)
Al-Walid II (r. 743–744)	Ali	Abu Sufyan	Abu Sufyan	Hashim	Abbas	Yazid
Qasim	Sa'id	Mu'awiya
Uthman

Dashed line indicates marriage
Italicized indicates female
Sufyanid caliphs
Marwanid caliphs
Nominated successors to the caliph
Sufyanid claimants to the caliphate during Abbasid rule

== Bibliography ==
- Cobb, Paul M. (2001). White Banners: Contention in 'Abbasid Syria, 750–880. SUNY Press. ISBN 978-0791448809.
- Lammens, H. & Bosworth, C. E. (1997). "Al-Shām. 2. History. (a) To 1918". In Bosworth, C. E.; van Donzel, E.; Heinrichs, W. P. & Lecomte, G. (eds.). The Encyclopaedia of Islam, Second Edition. Volume IX: San–Sze. Leiden: E. J. Brill. ISBN 978-90-04-10422-8.
- Madelung, Wilferd (2000). "Abūʾl-Amayṭar al-Sufyānī". Jerusalem Studies in Arabic and Islam. 24: 327–341.
