= Qutayla =

Qutayla (Arabic: قتيلة), also transliterated Ḳutaila and Ḳutayla, is an Arabic name. People bearing this name include:

- Qutayla ukht al-Nadr, seventh-century CE poet
- Qutaylah bint Abd-al-Uzza
