= Umar ibn Abi Rabi'ah =

Arab poet from Mecca (d. 719)

- Born: November 644; Mecca
- Died: 712/719; Mecca
- Father: Abd Allah Ibn Abi Rabia

ʿUmar ibn Abī Rabīʿah al-Makhzūmī (Arabic: عمر بن أبي ربيعة المخزومي) (November 644, Mecca – 712/719, Mecca, full name: Abū ’l-Khaṭṭāb ʿUmar ibn ʿAbd Allāh ibn Abī Rabīʿah Ibn al-Mughayra ibn ʿAbd Allāh ibn ʿUmar ibn Makhzūm ibn Yakaza ibn Murra al-Makhzūmī) was an Arab poet. He was born into a wealthy family of the Quraysh tribe of Mecca, his father being ʿAbd Allāh and his mother Asmā bint Mukharriba. He was characterised by the biographer Ibn Khallikan as 'the best poet ever produced by the tribe of Quraysh'.

He is known for his love poetry and for being one of the originators of the literary form ghazel in Islamic literature. He was "impassioned by everything beautiful that he saw in the street or during pilgrimage.". According to Ibn Khallikan, the most prominent object of his affections was al-Thurayya bint Ali Ibn ʿAbd Allāh ibn al-Ḥārith ibn Umayya al-Ashghar ibn ʿAbd Shams ibn ʿAbd Manāf, granddaughter of the famous poet Qutayla bint al-Nadr, who married Suhayl ibn ʿAbd al-Raḥmān Ibn Auf al-Zuhrī, on which occasion Umar recited the following famous verses, which pun on the fact that the married couple’s names are both names of heavenly bodies (Suhayl being Canopus and al-Thurayyā being the Pleiades):

O thou who joinest in marriage al-Thurayyā and Suhayl, tell me, I pray thee, how can they ever meet? The former rises in the north-east, and the latter in the south-east!

== See also ==
- Al-Arji
