= Al-Faddayni =

Umayyad anti-Abbasid rebel in 813

Arabia during al-Faddayni's lifetime

Sa'id ibn Khalid ibn Muhammad ibn Abd Allah ibn Amr ibn Uthman ibn Affan al-Uthmani (Arabic: سعيد بن خالد بن محمد بن عبد الله بن عمرو بن عثمان بن عفان, fl. 813 CE), commonly known as al-Faddayni (الفديني), was a member of the Umayyad family who led a failed revolt against the Abbasid Caliphate in the Hauran and Balqa (Transjordan) in 813, during the Fourth Muslim Civil War, in a bid to claim the caliphate. His revolt followed two other abortive revolts by Umayyad claimants to the caliphate in Damascus, those of Abu al-Umaytir al-Sufyani and Maslama ibn Ya'qub. In effect, al-Faddayni's rebellion was the last major attempt to resurrect the Umayyad Caliphate in Syria.

== Background ==
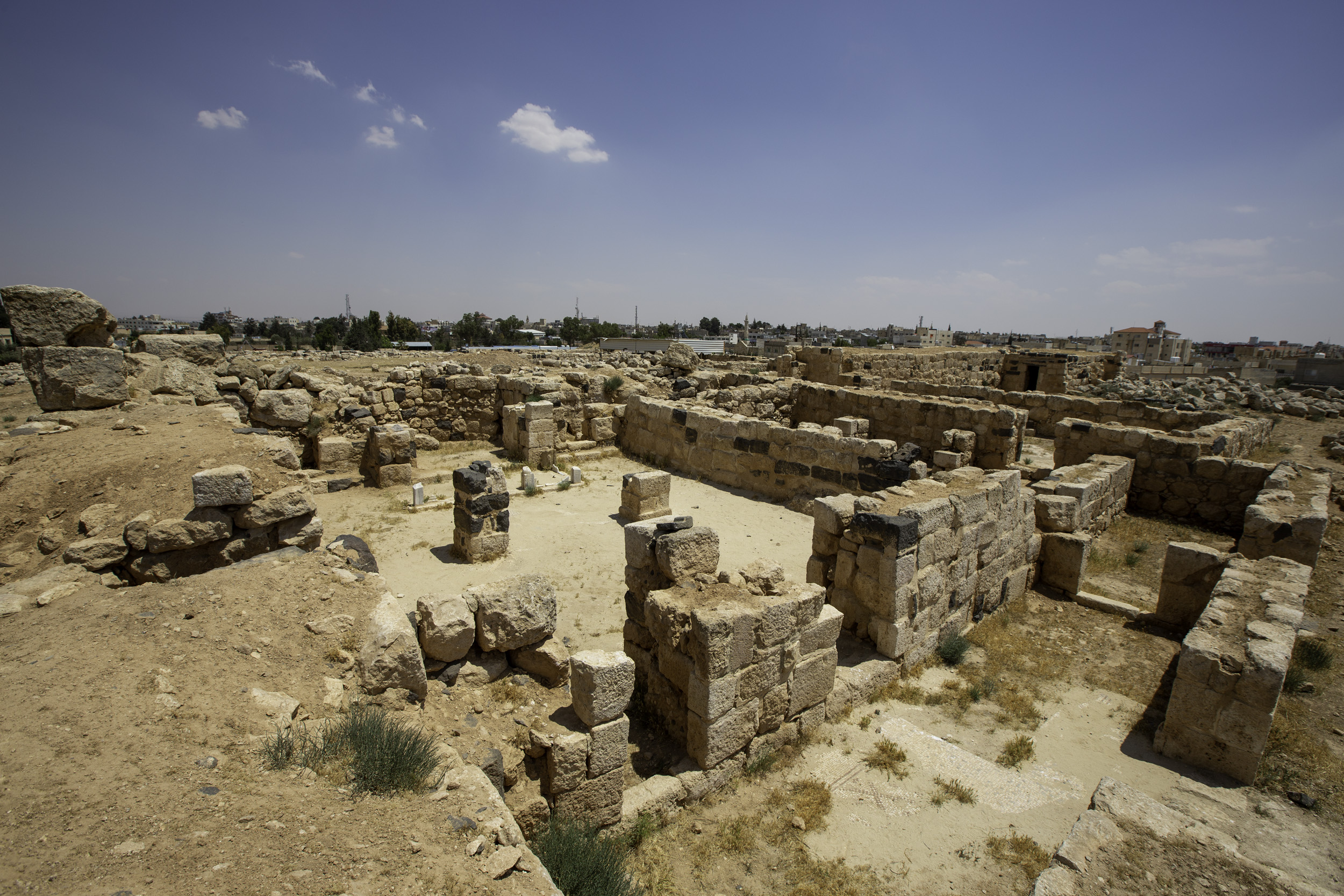
Ruins of al-Faddayn in al-Mafraq

Sa'id ibn Khalid ibn Muhammad ibn Abd Allah ibn Amr ibn Uthman was a descendant of Caliph Uthman (r. 644–656). His epithet 'al-Faddayni' derived from his establishment in al-Faddayn, an Umayyad aristocratic residence located within the modern town of al-Mafraq in the Hauran. An earlier member of his family, the eponymous Sa'id ibn Khalid ibn Amr ibn Uthman, owned the al-Faddayn estate during the reigns of the Umayyad caliphs Hisham (r. 724–743) and al-Walid II (r. 743–744), and the estate remained in the family's possession until al-Faddayni's time.

The daughter of the elder Sa'id ibn Khalid, Umm Uthman, was married to al-Faddayni's grandfather, Muhammad ibn Abdallah, better known as 'al-Dibaj'; Umm Uthman was previously married to Caliph Hisham. Al-Dibaj led frequent delegations from his hometown of Medina to the Umayyad caliphs, during which he was known to visit the desert estate of his cousin Sa'id ibn Khalid, who gifted him significant sums of money on each occasion. Although as descendants of Uthman they belonged to the Umayyad family, the line of Uthman was separate from the family's two ruling branches, the Sufyanids who ruled in 661–684 and the Marwanids who ruled in 684–750. The Umayyads were toppled in 750 and the Abbasid Caliphate was established. Al-Dibaj joined the revolt the Alid noble Muhammad al-Nafs al-Zakiyya in Medina in 762 and was consequently executed by the Abbasid caliph.

== Revolt ==
Map of 9th-century Syria

During the Fourth Muslim Civil War, Abbasid authority collapsed across Syria. In Damascus, an Umayyad notable descended from the Sufyanid line of Umayyad caliphs, Abu al-Umaytir al-Sufyani, took power in 811 with the key backing of the Banu Kalb/Yaman tribes, and his rule was recognized elsewhere in Syria, including in Hims and Sidon.

Abu al-Umaytir was deposed in 813 by the Qays, tribal rivals of the Yaman, led by Ibn Bayhas al-Kilabi using an Umayyad descended from the Marwanid line, Maslama ibn Ya'qub, as his proxy. Maslama claimed the caliphate himself and was soon after ousted. Both Maslama and Abu al-Umaytir escaped to the Ghouta where they held out for some time against Ibn Bayhas until their natural deaths. By 813, the Abbasid dynast al-Ma'mun overthrew his brother, Caliph al-Amin, and took control of the Abbasid caliphate in Baghdad.

Around the same time the Umayyad revolt in Damascus dissipated, probably still in 813, al-Faddayni proclaimed himself caliph. He allied with the Yaman and first moved against the Qays in his general vicinity, pursuing and killing members of the faction from the Banu Sa'd tribe. Ibn Bayhas dispatched his brother Yahya ibn Salih against al-Faddayni. Yahya besieged and chased him out of al-Faddayn, which was subsequently destroyed. Yahya next destroyed the fortress of Ziza in the Balqa near Amman.

Al-Faddayni then set up headquarters at Masuh, also near Amman, while a fellow Umayyad, Yahya ibn al-Hakam, controlled Amman proper. They were reinforced by Yamani tribesmen, including the Bali, as well as parts of the Qaysi Banu Fazara and groups from the Jordan Valley. Umayyad relatives and remnants of Abu al-Umaytir's supporters from Damascus also joined. In all, his forces swelled to some 20,000 men. Yahya ibn Salih moved against the Umayyads, defeated them, and put al-Faddayni to flight once more. He barricaded himself at Hisban, whereafter his tribal support disbanded and nothing more is heard of him.

According to the historian Wilferd Madelung, the abortive revolt of al-Faddayni was the last major attempt to reestablish the Umayyad Caliphate in Syria. The historian Paul M. Cobb notes that one more rebellion occurred in 906 by a notable claiming Sufyanid descent, but it was suppressed soon after.

Family tree of Umayyad claimants to the caliphate during the Fourth Muslim Civil War

Umayya
Abu al-As | Harb
al-Hakam | Affan | Abu Sufyan
Marwan I (r. 684–685) | Uthman (r. 644–656) | Mu'awiya I (r. 661–680)
Abd al-Malik (r. 685–705) | Amr | Yazid I (r. 680–683)
Maslama | Abd Allah | Khalid
Sa'id | Muhammad | Abd Allah
Muhammad | Khalid | Ali (Abu al-Umaytir)
Ali | Sa'id (al-Faddayni) | al-Qasim
Ya'qub
Maslama

Umayyad rebel claimants to the caliphate during the Fourth Fitna
Sufyanid caliphs
Marwanid caliphs
Caliph Uthman

== Bibliography ==
- Ahmed, Asad Q. (2011). The Religious Elite of the Early Islamic Ḥijāz: Five Prosopographical Case Studies. Oxford: Unit for Prosopographical Research, Linacre College, University of Oxford. ISBN 978-1-900934-13-8.
- Ballian, Anna (2012). Byzantium and Islam: Age of Transition, 7th-9th Century. New York: Metropolitan Museum of Art. ISBN 978-1-58839-457-6.
- Cobb, Paul M. (2001). White Banners: Contention in 'Abbasid Syria, 750–880. SUNY Press. ISBN 978-0791448809.
- Madelung, Wilferd (2000). "Abūʾl-Amayṭar al-Sufyānī". Jerusalem Studies in Arabic and Islam. 24: 327–341.
- Genequand, Denis (2020). "Elites in the Countryside: The Economic and Political Factors Behind the Umayyad Desert Castles". In Marsham, Andrew (ed.). The Umayyad World. London and New York: Routledge. pp. 240–266. ISBN 978-1-3174-3005-6.
