= Amr ibn Uthman =

Son of Uthman ibn Affan and military leader

Amr ibn Uthman عَمْرِو بْنُ عُثْمَانُ
- Born: c. 630; Medina, Hejaz, Arabia
- Died: c. 699–700; Mina, Mecca, Hejaz
- Spouses: Ramla bint Mu'awiya ibn Abi Sufyan; Hafsa bint Abd Allah ibn Umar ibn al-Khattab
- Children: Uthman al-Akbar; Khalid; Umar; Abdallah; Al-Mughira; Al-Bukayr
- Parents: Uthman (father); Umm Amr bint Jundab ibn Amr al-Dawsiyya (mother)
- Relatives: Abd Allah al-Arji (grandson); Abd al-Aziz ibn Abdallah (grandson); Muhmmad al-Dibaj (grandson); al-Faddayni (great-great-grandson)

Abu Uthman Amr ibn Uthman ibn Affan al-Umawi (Arabic: أَبُو عُثْمَانُ عَمْرِو بْنُ عُثْمَانُ بْنُ عَفَّان الأُمَوِيّ, romanized: Abū ʿUthmān ʿAmr ibn ʿUthmān ibn ʿAffān al-Umawī) was a son of Caliph Uthman (r. 644–656) and played political and military roles during the reigns of Umayyad caliphs Mu'awiya I (r. 661–680), Yazid I (r. 680–683) and Marwan I (r. 684–685). Uthman at least momentarily considered Amr a potential successor to the caliphate and Amr may have harbored caliphal ambitions during the reigns of his Umayyad cousins. His many descendants forged close ties with the Umayyads and, to a lesser extent, their rivals, the Alids, Abbasids and Zubayrids, some serving administrative office in the Hejaz and others as nobles, commanders and poets in Medina or Syria during Umayyad and Abbasid rule.

== Early life ==
Amr was a son of Caliph Uthman (r. 644–656) from the Umayyad clan of the Quraysh tribe and his wife Umm Amr bint Jundab ibn Amr of the Daws clan of the Azd tribe. He was born during the rule of Uthman's predecessor, Caliph Umar (r. 634–644). Biographical details about Amr are often confused in the traditional Islamic sources with Amr's full brother Umar. The historian al-Baladhuri (d. 892) asserts that Amr was Uthman's eldest son to have survived the caliph, who was killed in 656, and the historian Mus'ab al-Zubayri (d. 851) holds that Amr was the eldest of Uthman's sons to leave descendants, while the historians Ibn Hajar al-Asqalani (d. 1492) and al-Qalqashandi (d. 1418) attribute both facts to Umar. Al-Zubayri further relates that Uthman privately named Amr as the second-in-line to succeed him as caliph after the leading companion of Muhammad, al-Zubayr ibn al-Awwam. Amr was relegated to second-in-line because of his young age at the time. According to the modern historian Wilferd Madelung, this testament by Uthman most likely occurred during his illness in the year 644/45 and was discarded as soon as Uthman regained his health.

== Later life and political roles ==
During the rule of the Damascus-based Caliph Mu'awiya I (r. 661–680), founder of the Umayyad Caliphate, Amr married his daughter Ramla and they lived in Medina, the former capital of Amr's father. Amr and Mu'awiya likely maintained friendly ties for much of the caliph's reign, but latent tension may have developed between them due to Mu'awiya's suspicions of Amr's ambitions for the caliphate and the influence of their Umayyad kinsman Marwan ibn al-Hakam over Amr to pursue the caliphate. The modern historian Asad Q. Ahmed views these claims as difficult to "verify or refute". Amr's role in the Battle of al-Harra in 683 between the Syrian army of Mu'awiya's son and successor Yazid I (r. 680–683) and the people of Medina who declared rebellion against the caliph is inconsistently reported in the traditional sources: al-Baladhuri holds that Amr fought alongside the Medinese and was consequently castigated and flogged by the victorious Syrian general Muslim ibn Uqba; Awana ibn al-Hakam holds that Amr was not expelled with the rest of the Umayyads of Medina, remained in the city and was punished by Ibn Uqba; while Abu Mikhnaf claims Amr was expelled with the Umayyads but refused to divulge intelligence about Medina's defenses as requested by Ibn Uqba.

After Marwan, who had been expelled from Medina in 683, was elected caliph by the Syrian loyalists of the Umayyads in 684, Amr refused to recognize his caliphate. Nonetheless, there was apparently close ties between Amr and Marwan's household; Amr or Umar was married to Marwan's niece Umm Kulthum bint al-Harith ibn al-Hakam and married off his own daughter Umm Ayyub to Marwan's son and successor Caliph Abd al-Malik (r. 685–705). Amr continued to live in the Hejaz and died in Mina c. 699/700 CE.

== Descendants ==
From his marriage to Ramla, Amr had two sons, Uthman and Khalid. The former died childless, while Khalid was a dignitary in Medina whose many descendants forged strong marital, political and economic links with the rest of the Umayyad clan in Syria and Medina. Khalid married Umm Uthman, the daughter of the Umayyad Sa'id ibn al-As and their son, Sa'id, the only son of Khalid with progeny, was married to Umm Amr, the daughter of Marwan. Sa'id wed his daughter Umm Uthman to the Umayyad caliph Hisham ibn Abd al-Malik (r. 724–743) and they had a son, Sa'id. Umm Uthman was later married to another of Amr's descendants, Muhammad al-Dibaj ibn Abdallah.

Amr's son Abdallah was born to his wife Hafsa, a daughter of Abd Allah ibn Umar and granddaughter of caliph Umar and whose mother, Safiyya bint Ubayd, was the sister of the pro-Alid rebel Mukhtar al-Thaqafi. Safiyya's mother, Atika, belonged to the Umayyad family of Asid ibn Abi al-Is and Amr's son Abdallah maintained marital links with this branch of the Umayyads, marrying a daughter of Abdallah ibn Khalid ibn Asid. From this marriage, Abdallah had two sons and four daughters, including Umm Abdallah, who was successively married to the Umayyad caliph al-Walid I (r. 705–715) and the Umayyad caliph Sulayman ibn Abd al-Malik's son and appointed successor Ayyub. Abdallah's sons from this marriage, Abd al-Aziz and Umayya, respectively served as governor of Mecca and tax collector over the tribes of Tayy and Asad under the later Umayyad caliphs. Abdallah also had children by another Umayyad, his second cousin Umm Amr, the daughter of Aban ibn Uthman, including their daughter Sa'da (Umm Sa'id), who was successively married to the Umayyad caliphs Yazid II (r. 720–724) and Hisham. Marital links with the Umayyad caliphs were further perpetuated through Abdallah's children with a third wife, Asma bint Abd al-Rahman, a granddaughter of al-Harith ibn Hisham of the Banu Makhzum: their daughters Hafsa and A'isha were married to the Umayyad prince and governor Abd al-Aziz ibn Marwan and caliph Sulayman, respectively. On the other hand, their son, Khalid, who married a daughter from the family of Asid ibn Abi al-Is, fell out of favor under Yazid II and died after being beaten on the caliph's orders for refusing to sanction his sister's marriage to him. Khalid's son Abdallah was slain along with Abd al-Aziz and Umayya at the Battle of Qudayd.

While the line of Abdallah ibn Amr was largely ensconced with the Umayyads, several descendants forged close ties to rival families of the Umayyads, namely the Alids, Abbasids, and Zubayrids. Khalid's granddaughter Ruqayya bint Amr was married to the Abbasid caliph al-Mahdi (r. 775–785) and his great-great-grandson Amr ibn Muhammad ibn Yahya ibn Amr was the qadi of Medina under caliph al-Mu'tamid (r. 870–892). Abdallah's son Muhammad al-Dibaj, from his Alid wife Fatima bint al-Husayn ibn Ali, was a strong supporter of his Alid cousins in the leadup to the Alid revolt of 762–763. Al-Dibaj's daughter Ruqayya and the daughter of his full brother al-Qasim were both married off to caliph Hisham or his son under duress, harming ties between the Umayyads and this line of Abdallah's descendants. Likewise, descendants of Amr's son (from an unnamed concubine) al-Mughira, a Medinan poet, forged marital ties to al-Dibaj's family, Zubayrids and the Abbasids. His granddaughter A'isha bint Abdallah ibn Sa'id was married to caliph Harun al-Rashid (r. 786–809) then his brother Mansur ibn al-Mahdi and her brother Muhammad served as governor of Mecca under al-Rashid. By the reign of Hisham, another of Amr's sons, al-Bukayr, shifted away from close ties with the Umayyads to the Zubayrids, marrying Sukayna, the daughter of Mus'ab ibn al-Zubayr). Another of Amr's son with a concubine was Umar, of whom nothing is known except that he was the father of the prominent Medinan poet Abd Allah al-Arji. The latter was married to Bukayr's daughter Uthayma, from whom he had his sons Zayd and Umar.

Descendants of Amr ibn Uthman

Uthman (r. 644–656)
Amr
Uthman al-Akbar	Khalid	Umar	Bukayr	al-Mughira	Anbasa	Abdallah
Ramla	Sa'id	Abdallah al-Arji	Uthayma (wife of al-Arji)	Uthman	Sa'id	Abdallah	Umayya	Khalid	Abd al-Aziz	Sa'da (wife of Yazid II)	Muhammad al-Dibaj	al-Qasim	Umm Abdallah (wife of al-Walid I)	Hafsa (wife of Abd al-Aziz ibn Marwan)	A'isha (wife of Sulayman)
Umm Uthman (wife of Hisham)	Umm Abd al-Malik (wife of al-Walid II)	Salma (wife of al-Walid II)	Abd al-Malik	Zayd	Umar	Kubaysha	Abdallah	Umar	Abdallah	Amr	Abd al-Jabbar	Izza (wife of al-Walid I)	Hafsa	Ruqayya (daughter-in-law of Hisham)	Ruqayya al-Sughra (wife of Ibrahim ibn Abdallah)	al-Qasim	Khalid
A'isha (wife of Harun al-Rashid)	Abd al-Aziz	Muhammad	Ubaydallah	Ruqayya (wife of al-Mahdi)	Yahya	Sa'id al-Faddayni
Muhammad	Uthman	Muhammad	Muhammad
Uthman	Ubaydallah	Ubaydallah	Amr
Muhammad	Umar
Ahmad

Umayyad claimants to the caliphate during Abbasid rule

== Bibliography ==
- Ahmed, Asad Q. (2011). The Religious Elite of the Early Islamic Ḥijāz: Five Prosopographical Case Studies. Oxford: University of Oxford Linacre College Unit for Prosopographical Research. ISBN 978-1-900934-13-8.
- Madelung, Wilferd (1997). The Succession to Muhammad: A Study of the Early Caliphate. Cambridge: Cambridge University Press. ISBN 0-521-56181-7.
- Gordon, Matthew S.; Robinson, Chase F.; Rowson, Everett K.; Fishbein, Michael, eds. (2018). The Works of Ibn Wāḍiḥ al-Yaʿqūbī: An English Translation. Vol. 3. Brill. ISBN 978-90-04-36416-5.
