= Muhammad al-Dibaj ibn Abdallah =

Muhammad ibn Abdallah ibn Amr ibn Uthman al-Uthmani (fl. 740s – c. 762), commonly known as al-Dibaj, was an Arab nobleman of Medina during the late Umayyad and early Abbasid periods. A patrilineal descendant of Caliph Uthman and matrilineal descendant of Caliph Ali, he was noted in the early Islamic sources for his distinguished ancestry. He was imprisoned, tortured and executed on the orders of the Abbasid caliph al-Mansur in 762 in during the Alid Revolt for his perceived support of his nephew, the Alid rebel Muhammad al-Nafs al-Zakiyya.

== Family and background ==
Muhammad's father, Abdallah, was a son of Amr ibn Uthman and grandson of Uthman (r. 644–656), the third Rashidun caliph and member of the Umayyad family. In addition to his Uthmanid paternal roots, Abdallah's mother, Hafsa bint Abdallah ibn Umar, was a granddaughter of the second Rashidun caliph Umar (r. 634–644) and daughter of Safiyya bint Abi Ubayd, the sister of the pro-Alid revolutionary al-Mukhtar al-Thaqafi. Muhammad is also named Muhammad 'al-Asghar' by al-Sam'ani, implying his father Abdallah, who had several wives, had another, elder son by the same name. Muhammad's mother, Fatima, was a daughter of al-Husayn, the son of Ali (r. 656–661), the fourth Rashidun caliph, and grandson of the Islamic prophet Muhammad. Before her marriage to Abdallah, Fatima was married to al-Hasan ibn al-Hasan (a grandson of Ali), with whom she had her older son, Abd Allah al-Mahd. Muhammad gained his epithet al-Dibaj ('the silk' or 'the brocade') for his physical beauty.

The two known wives of al-Dibaj were both descendants of Talha, a prominent companion of Muhammad: Umm Kulthum bint Ibrahim ibn Muhammad ibn Talha and her niece, Hafsa bint Imran ibn Ibrahim ibn Muhammad ibn Talha. From Umm Kulthum, al-Dibaj had a daughter, Ruqayya, who was wed to Muhammad, a son of the Umayyad caliph Hisham (r. 724–743). Al-Dibaj married Hafsa after her previous marriages to his full brother, al-Qasim, Caliph Hisham, and two great-grandsons of Caliph Ali. With Hafsa, he had a daughter, Ruqayya al-Sughra ('Ruqayya the Younger', to distinguish her from her elder sister). Al-Dibaj also had a daughter named Hafsa, who was married to one of his Uthmanid cousins, Abdallah ibn Sa'id ibn al-Mughira ibn Amr. By dint of al-Dibaj's lineage from the prominent Umayyad and Alid families of the Quraysh tribe, especially the Alids, and his family relations, he attained a distinguished noble status in early Muslim Arab society.

Al-Dibaj's son al-Qasim is cited as a transmitter of information about his father by al-Tabari. After Ibrahim's death, al-Dibaj's daughter Ruqayya al-Sughra married a member of the Abbasid family, Muhammad ibn Ibrahim ibn Muhammad ibn Ali (a great-great-grandson of Ibn Abbas). Al-Dibaj's grandchildren (the children of his daughter Hafsa) reconciled with the Abbasids as part of such efforts with the nobility of Medina by al-Mansur's successor, Caliph al-Mahdi.

== Life ==
Al-Dibaj generally inclined toward his maternal relatives, including Abd Allah al-Mahd, his half-brother, with whom he was particularly close. He relayed hadiths, some of which originated from his mother. He also maintained close, though not necessarily friendly, ties with his distant paternal kinsmen, the Umayyad caliphs, acting as an envoy between them and the notables of Medina, where he resided. The sources indicate al-Dibaj was more motivated in the lucrative gifts he received from the caliphs and others on these diplomatic missions, rather than kinship.

=== Imprisonment and death in Alid Revolt of 762 ===
In 750, the Umayyads were toppled by the Abbasids, who took over as the ruling family of the caliphate. Their rule was opposed by al-Dibaj's nephews, Muhammad al-Nafs al-Zakiyya and his brother Ibrahim (sons of Abd Allah al-Mahd), who viewed Abbasid rule as a usurpation of their own right to rule the caliphate as descendants of the prophet Muhammad's daughter Fatima. In the leadup to their rebellion in Medina and Iraq, in 762, the Abbasid caliph al-Mansur had nearly thirty of their relatives in Medina arrested and imprisoned while he was staying in al-Rabadha on the outskirts of Medina. Most of the prisoners were Hasanids (a main branch of the Alids) and among the four non-Hasanids were al-Dibaj and two of his sons.

The 9th-century historian al-Tabari and other medieval Islamic histories narrate lengthy descriptions of the torture of al-Dibaj at al-Rabadha followed by his execution in al-Mansur's court in Iraq. Al-Dibaj was arrested at his estate in al-Badr, scene of the famous Battle of Badr, taken first to Medina, from where he and his sons were brought to al-Mansur at al-Rabadha. There, al-Mansur, interrogated him about the whereabouts of his nephews Muhammad al-Nafs al-Zakiyya and Ibrahim, the latter of whom was married to al-Dibaj's daughter Ruqayya al-Sughra who lived with al-Dibaj (due to Ibrahim's being constantly on the run from the authorities). To extract the information, al-Mansur had al-Dibaj flogged (sixty, one hundred or one hundred fifty times, depending on the source). After al-Nafs al-Zakiyya and Ibrahim launched their revolts in Medina and Basra in September and November, respectively, al-Dibaj was brought in chains to Qasr Ibn Hubayra in Iraq where he was decapitated, his head being presented to the people of Khurasan as that of al-Nafs al-Zakiyya (whose actual name, like that of al-Dibaj, was 'Muhammad ibn Abdallah').

The lengthy narrations of the incident, which include verbatim arguments between al-Dibaj and al-Mansur over the caliph's accusations are mostly a literary topoi, according to historian Amikam Elad. The latter notes that al-Dibaj endured the harshest treatment of all al-Mansur's prisoners at al-Rabadha. Most of the traditions cite al-Mansur's fury at al-Dibaj's ingratitude toward the Abbasids despite the estates and gifts they bestowed on al-Dibaj. The traditions suggest al-Mansur's hostility was colored by al-Dibaj's being an Umayyad. The Umayyads and Hashimids (the clan to which the Abbasids and Alids both belonged) had a long history of animosity from the early days of Islam to the Abbasid Revolution, when dozens of Umayyads were executed by the Abbasids across the caliphate. One tradition in the narration of al-Dibaj's torture suggests al-Mansur considered al-Dibaj especially dangerous since, as an Umayyad, he could potentially rally the pro-Umayyad tribes of Syria to back the revolt of al-Nafs al-Zakiyya.

== Bibliography ==
- Ahmed, Asad Q. (2011). The Religious Elite of the Early Islamic Ḥijāz: Five Prosopographical Case Studies. Oxford: University of Oxford Linacre College Unit for Prosopographical Research. ISBN 978-1-900934-13-8.
- Elad, Amikam (2016). The Rebellion of Muḥammad al-Nafs al-Zakiyya in 145/762: Ṭālibīs and Early ʿAbbāsīs in Conflict. Leiden: Brill. ISBN 9789004296220.
- McAuliffe, Jane Dammen, ed. (1995). The History of al-Ṭabarī, Volume XXVIII: The ʿAbbāsid Authority Affirmed: The Early Years of al-Mansūr, A.D. 753–763/A.H. 136–145. SUNY Series in Near Eastern Studies. Albany, New York: State University of New York Press. ISBN 978-0-7914-1895-6.
