= Ibn Bayhas al-Kilabi =

Abbasid governor of Syria, Damascus from 813 to 824/5

Ibn Bayhas al-Kilabi ابن بيهس

Governor of Syria and Damascus
- In office 813–823/25
- Monarch: al-Ma'mun
- Preceded by: Sulayman ibn Abd Allah
- Succeeded by: Abdallah ibn Tahir (as governor of Syria); Ma'yuf ibn Yahya al-Hamdani or Sadaqa ibn Uthman al-Murri (as deputy governor of Damascus)

Personal details
- Born: Sham, Abbasid Caliphate
- Died: 820s al-Iraq, Abbasid Caliphate
- Relations: Kardam ibn Bayhas (uncle); Bayhas ibn Zumayl (grandfather); Yahya ibn Salih (brother)
- Parent: Salih ibn Bayhas al-Kilabi (father)
- Full name: Muhammad ibn Salih ibn Bayhas al-Kilabi
- Military career
- Allegiance: Abbasid Caliphate
- Branch: Abbasid army
- Service years: 826 (end of active service)
- Rank: General
- Units: Abbasid Syrian regiment, Kilabi tribesmen of Ibn Bayhas
- Conflicts: Suppression of pro-Umayyad revolts of 820s

Muhammad ibn Salih ibn Bayhas al-Kilabi (محمد بن صالح بن بيهس الكلابي), better known as Ibn Bayhas (Arabic: ابن بيهس), was the Abbasid governor of Damascus in September 813–824/825 and a prominent chief of the Qays tribes in the environs of Damascus against their Yamani rivals. Under his leadership, a succession of Umayyad claimants to the caliphate, Abu al-Umaytir al-Sufyani, Maslama ibn Ya'qub al-Marwani and Sa'id ibn Khalid al-Uthmani, were defeated, marking an end to serious challenges of Abbasid authority in Syria by remnants of the Umayyad dynasty, which had been toppled by the Abbasids in 750. Although a loyalist of Caliph al-Ma'mun, he was viewed as a rival by al-Ma'mun's viceroy of Syria, Abd Allah ibn Tahir ibn al-Husayn, who deposed him around 824/825. Two years later, he was brought to Iraq, where he eventually died.

== Background ==
Ibn Bayhas was the son of Salih ibn Bayhas, who, in 800, was sent by the Abbasid caliph Harun al-Rashid to the Byzantine empress Irene in Constantinople to ransom Abbasid prisoners-of-war. Salih's brother Kardam had been the Umayyad governor of Oman. Their father, Bayhas ibn Zumayl, was a noble (sharif) of the Banu Kilab tribe in Damascus. He served as the seal-bearer of the Umayyad caliph al-Walid II and witnessed the latter's assassination in 743, which sparked the Third Muslim Civil War.

Ibn Bayhas was a tribal chief, warrior and poet. He became "a key power broker" in Syria, according to the historian Wilferd Madelung. He was viewed by his Qaysi tribal partisans as their champion against theirs rivals, the Yaman–Banu Kalb. The Qays–Yaman rivalry for power and influence in Syria dated to the early Umayyad period in the 680s and remained potent during Abbasid rule, which began in 750. Unlike most of his Qaysi brethren in Syria, who opposed the Abbasids, Ibn Bayhas was an Abbasid loyalist and did not support the remnants of the Umayyad dynasty in the region and their supporters, who on several occasions attempted to expel the Abbasids.

== Suppression of pro-Umayyad rebellion ==
The pro-Umayyads in Syria attempted to gain power during the political chaos of the Fourth Muslim Civil War, which pitted the Abbasid contenders for the caliphate, Caliph al-Amin and his brother al-Ma'mun, sons of Harun al-Rashid, against each other. The Abbasid governor of Syria, Sulayman ibn Abi Ja'far, imprisoned Ibn Bayhas in a dungeon inside the Palace of al-Hajjaj, where the governor resided. Sulayman may have been persuaded to arrest Ibn Bayhas by the pro-Umayyad conspirators, who at this point were operating clandestinely. The pro-Umayyad faction raised support from Yamani and Qaysi tribesmen and affiliates, but feared that the ardently pro-Abbasid Ibn Bayhas would not come to their side. They resolved to neutralize him by convincing the Abbasid governor that Ibn Bayhas was a leader of the Zawaqil, desert brigands who were devastating the Syrian countryside during the civil war.

Soon after Ibn Bayhas was imprisoned, the pro-Umayyad rebellion was launched, with a descendant of the Umayyad caliph Mu'awiya I (r. 661–680), Abu al-Umaytir, at the helm. The rebels besieged Sulayman in his palace, prompting him to free Ibn Bayhas in return for safely escorting him out of Damascus. Ibn Bayhas and his horsemen secured Sulayman's escape through the Hauran, accompanying him as far Thaniyyat al-Uqab in the Syrian Desert before parting ways; Sulayman returned to Iraq while Ibn Bayhas headed back to the Hauran. Large parts of Syria, namely Damascus, the Beqaa Valley, most of the coastal cities, such as Sidon, and Jund Hims (district of Homs), came under Abu al-Umaytir's authority. Al-Amin dispatched a son of his general Ali ibn Isa ibn Mahan to suppress the Syrian rebellion, but he halted at the city of Raqqa in the Jazira, the province bordering Syria to the northeast. This was possibly due to concerns that Ibn Bayhas, the Abbasids' main ally in Syria at this time, was a supporter of al-Ma'mun.

Abu al-Umaytir invited Ibn Bayhas to back his revolt, but he refused. Instead, Ibn Bayhas rallied tribesmen from the Dibab, the branch of the Banu Kilab to which he belonged, the Banu Numayr, and his mawali (non-Arab clients or freedmen) and headed for Damascus to relieve the Qays there from the persecutions of Abu al-Umaytir's largely Yamani following. Abu al-Umaytir sent against him an Umayyad kinsman, who routed Ibn Bayhas's forces in the Hauran, causing them to disperse to different parts of Syria, with the Banu Murra chief Sadaqa ibn Uthman fleeing for Tiberias and another Qaysi chief, Umara, retreating to Adhri'at (modern Daraa). The tide turned against the Umayyads when, upon the Umayyad force's return to Damascus, they were ambushed by local villagers or nomads affiliated with the Qays. Ibn Bayhas took advantage, gathering his men and leading a charge which brought them to the gates of Damascus. Ibn Bayhas remained encamped in the Ghouta gardens, which surround Damascus, attacking anyone leaving or entering the city. Abu al-Umaytir called on his Yamani supporters from the Beqaa, Baalbek and Sidon to relieve the siege, whereupon tens of thousands of his loyalists arrived and engaged in a heavy battle with the Qaysi besiegers. Both sides suffered heavy losses and Ibn Bayhas was forced to retreat to the Hauran. The death of Abu al-Umaytir's son, al-Qasim, during the battle spurred Abu al-Umaytir to send his troops against Ibn Bayhas, but they were defeated.

The victory of Ibn Bayhas in the Hauran significantly weakened Abu al-Umaytir's position; however, Ibn Bayhas had fallen ill and could not lead his men on an attack against the Umayyad leader. Instead, he nominated another Umayyad, Maslama ibn Ya'qub, from the Marwanid line of the Umayyad dynasty, which historically had been closely identified with the Qays, to lead them. The Banu Numayr gave Maslama their oath of allegiance and together they assaulted Damascus, arresting Abu al-Umaytir in his residence, the Green Palace. Maslama gained oaths of allegiance as caliph from the Umayyad family members and mawali in the city, while he rewarded the Qays with plots and pasturelands.

When Ibn Bayhas recovered he came to view Maslama as a threat and resolved to neutralize him. He gathered a Qaysi army which Maslama's own Qaysi partisans confronted at the city gates. The spectacle of Qaysi in-fighting may have caused the Qaysi supporters of Maslama to reconsider their allegiance; in the aftermath of the inconclusive battle, they secretly defected to Ibn Bayhas. With help from the Qaysi defectors inside Damascus, Ibn Bayhas's men scaled the Bab Kaysan gate and entered the city victoriously on 13 September 813. Maslama and Abu al-Umaytir had already escaped together and gained refuge in the Yamani villages of the Ghouta.

== Governor of Damascus ==
Shortly after capturing Damascus, Ibn Bayhas was recognized as governor of Jund Dimashq (the military district of Damascus) by al-Ma'mun, who had by then defeated and succeeded al-Amin. He restored the properties expropriated and redistributed by the Umayyad counter-caliphs to their previous owners, including to the members of the Banu Hashim (the clan to which the Islamic prophet Muhammad and the Abbasids belonged) and their mawali who had fled Umayyad rule. He minted silver dirhams in the city, inscribed in his and al-Ma'mun's name, which marked the first time Abbasid coins were minted in Damascus. His associate, al-Harith ibn Isa, assumed control of the port of Tyre and supervised its harbor of warships.

Although he governed with the recognition of the Abbasids, Ibn Bayhas ruled "purely on his own" and worked to strengthen the Qaysi position in the district at the expense of the hitherto dominant Yaman, according to the historian Paul Cobb.

=== Suppression of pro-Umayyad revolts and Yamani opposition ===
Ibn Bayhas struggled to rein in his Yamani opponents. The conflict was centered around the Yamani-dominated villages of Mezzeh, Darayya and Beit Lihya in the Ghouta where Abu al-Umaytir and Maslama were being protected. Beit Lihya eventually surrendered, but Mezzeh and Darayya held out, at least until the natural deaths of the two Umayyads.

Shortly afterward, Ibn Bayhas had to contend with another Umayyad revolt, this time led by a descendant of Caliph Uthman (r. 644–656), Sa'id ibn Khalid al-Faddayni, who gathered around him tribesmen of the Yamani Bali and Qaysi Fazara tribes, as well as Umayyad kinsmen and remnants of the pro-Umayyad rebels from the Ghouta and Damascus in the Balqa (central Transjordan). Against him, Ibn Bayhas dispatched his brother Yahya, who chased al-Faddayni from his fortress near modern al-Mafraq, and defeated him in clashes around Amman. Al-Faddayni eventually barricaded himself in the fortress of Hisban, where he remained untouched while his forces eventually dispersed. His defeat marked the last Umayyad attempt at overturning Abbasid rule.

=== Dismissal ===
In 821, al-Ma'mun appointed, Abd Allah ibn Tahir ibn al-Husayn, as the viceroy of Raqqa, Syria and Egypt. Abd Allah arrived in Damascus in 823, 824, or 825, most probably after his arrest of the Qaysi rebel Nasr ibn Shabath al-Uqayli in the Jazira. Ibn Bayhas was considered a rival authority by the Abbasid viceroy, who thus dismissed him from Damascus and al-Harith ibn Isa from Tyre. According to an account traced to Ibn Bayhas's brother Yahya, Abd Allah mocked Ibn Bayhas for boasting of his many deeds for al-Ma'mun (the 'Commander of the Faithful') "as if [he] were Tahir ibn al-Husayn", Abd Allah's father and al-Ma'mun's top general. Ibn Bayhas is held to have responded:

Tahir ibn al-Husayn fought for the Commander of the Faithful with money and men of the Commander of the Faithful. I fought for the Commander of the Faithful with my own money and tribesmen.

As Ibn Bayhas's replacement, Abd Allah initially appointed Sadaqa ibn Uthman al-Murri. (Note: A son of an Abbasid general of Yamani origins, Ma'yuf ibn Yahya ibn Ma'yuf al-Hajuri al-Hamdani, and the latter's son Humayd, may have been appointed by Nasr as the deputy governors of Damascus when he was on mission outside of the city.) Ibn Bayhas remained in Syria, but upon Abd Allah's return to Iraq in 827, he brought Ibn Bayhas with him. Sadaqa was dismissed before their departure and replaced with Nasr ibn Hamza. Ibn Bayhas was forbidden by the authorities to return to Syria and he died in Iraq.

== Bibliography ==
- Crone, Patricia (1980). Slaves on Horses: The Evolution of the Islamic Polity (1980 ed.). Cambridge: Cambridge University Press. ISBN 978-0521229616.
- Madelung, Wilferd (2000). "Abūʾl ʿAmayṭar the Sufyānī". Jerusalem Studies in Arabic and Islam. 24: 327–343.
- Cobb, Paul M. (2001). White Banners: Contention in 'Abbasid Syria, 750–880. SUNY Press. ISBN 978-0-7914-4880-9.
