= Khadra Palace =

Residence of the Umayyad caliphs in Damascus

Coordinates: 33°30′39″N 36°18′22″E

The Khadra Palace, known in Arabic as Qubbat al-Khadra (قبة الخضراء, lit. 'the Green Dome'), was a residence of the Umayyad caliphs in Damascus. It was founded by the first Umayyad caliph, Mu'awiya I (r. 661–680), while he was governor of Syria under Caliph Uthman (r. 644–656). The Khadra Palace consisted of a series of interconnected buildings, including the caliphal residence, stables, mint and prison, situated directly behind the Umayyad Mosque. Little information is available describing the structure, other than the green color of its dome, its construction from baked brick, timber and marble pavement and its setting amid gardens.

It remained in official use after the fall of the Umayyads and transfer of the caliphate to Iraq by the Abbasids in 750. It was probably destroyed during the Fatimid period in the 10th or 11th century and there are no known traces of the structure.

== Location and composition ==
The Khadra Palace was situated immediately south of the Umayyad Mosque, which until Caliph al-Walid I's reconstruction, had consisted of only a part of the Christian cathedral of John the Baptist. The palace originally lay behind the mosque's Mihrab of the Companions, which in Mu'awiya's time served as the mosque's central mihrab (prayer niche) in the southeastern section of the qibla (prayer direction) wall.

== History ==
There is little information available in the literary sources about the Khadra Palace. The original structure may have been a Byzantine palace for the governor of Damascus or was founded by Mu'awiya, the governor of Syria under Caliph Uthman. His brother and predecessor, Yazid ibn Abi Sufyan, also built a palace in the city. Mu'awiya became caliph in 661, establishing the capital of the newly-founded Umayyad Caliphate in Damascus.

The Khadra Palace was built of baked brick and timber and paved with marble. It was amid gardens characterized by fountains, myrtles and vines. An anecdote about Mu'awiya rebuilding it of stone in response to a Byzantine envoy's comment that the palace was fit for birds and rats, is probably a topos, according to the historian Finbar Barry Flood. The Khadra Palace probably included the other structures directly behind mosque, including the mint, barracks, stables and prison, all separate buildings connected to each other in a complex with a courtyard in its center.

The Umayyad caliph Abd al-Malik (r. 685–705) purchased the palace from Mu'awiya's grandson Khalid ibn Yazid and used it as his residence in the city. Abd al-Malik's son and successor al-Walid I possibly remodeled the palace when he ordered the construction of the Umayyad Mosque.

Reports that the palace was destroyed by the Abbasids are likely false. The Abbasids may have used the Khadra Palace or the Palace of Yazid ibn Abi Sufyan as a prison. Successive Umayyad pretenders to the caliphate who took control of Damascus during the Great Abbasid Civil War, Abu al-Umaytir al-Sufyani and Maslama ibn Ya'qub al-Marwani, used the Khadra Palace as their seat of power in 811–813 until being driven out by Abbasid loyalists. Reports by Muslim geographers attest to its existence and location through the 10th century. It was destroyed during Fatimid rule of the city in the 11th century. The 12th-century traveler Ibn Jubayr remarked that the city's Coppersmiths Row, "there is no more beautiful-looking row of shops than this", behind the Umayyad Mosque was formerly the site of the Khadra Palace. There are no known traces of the structure.

== Bibliography ==
- Dunlop, Douglas M. (1971). Arab Civilization to A.D. 1500. New York and Washington: Praeger.
- Flood, Finbar Barry (2001). The Great Mosque of Damascus: Studies on the Makings of an Umayyad Visual Culture. Leiden, Boston and Köln: Brill. ISBN 90-04-11638-9.
- Madelung, Wilferd (2000). "Abūʾl-Amayṭar al-Sufyānī". Jerusalem Studies in Arabic and Islam. 24: 327–341.
