= Isa ibn Talha al-Taymi =

7th-century notable of the Quraysh in Medina

ʿĪsā ibn Ṭalḥa al-Taymī (fl. 660s – c. 690s) was a notable of the Quraysh in Medina and is cited as a transmitter of historical reports by early Islamic historians.

== Family, life and work ==
Isa was a son of Talha ibn Ubaydallah, a prominent companion of Muhammad from the Banu Taym clan of the Quraysh tribe. Isa's mother was Su'da bint Awf ibn Kharija ibn Sinan, a prominent chief of the Banu Murra tribe and noted peacemaker among the tribes of the Ghatafan in north central Arabia in the pre-Islamic period. Isa's family became part of the early Islamic nobility in Medina, which served as the seat of the Muslim state from the 620s until 656 and afterward retained prominence as a religious and cultural center of the Caliphate.

Isa was part of a delegation of Medinese notables sent to the Umayyad caliph Mu'awiya I (r. 661–680) in Damascus. A number of reports related to Mu'awiya in the early Islamic sources are attributed to Isa's encounter with the caliph. Nothing is heard of Isa again until the reign of the Umayyad caliph Abd al-Malik (r. 685–705) when he was part of another delegation of notables from Medina who requested that the caliph dismiss their governor in 692–694, al-Hajjaj ibn Yusuf. Abd al-Malik accepted their request.

Isa had a son by the same name from his wife Umm Isa bint Iyad of the Banu Asad clan of the Quraysh. Another son, Muhammad, was a courtier and panegyrist of the Abbasid caliph al-Mansur (r. 754–775). Muhammad's son, also named Muhammad, by his kinswoman, a daughter of Ibrahim ibn Muhammad ibn Talha, served the same role, while the elder Muhammad's daughter, Fatima, married al-Mansur and had three sons by him, Sulayman, Ya'qub, and Isa. Sulayman served several important offices under the Abbasid caliph Harun al-Rashid.

== Bibliography ==
- Ahmed, Asad Q. (2010). The Religious Elite of the Early Islamic Ḥijāz: Five Prosopographical Case Studies. University of Oxford Linacre College Unit for Prosopographical Research. ISBN 9781900934138.
