= Sulayman ibn Abi Ja'far =

Abbasid prince and political leader (766/7 – 813/5)

Sulayman ibn Abd Allah al-Mansur سليمان بن عبد الله المنصور

Governor of Syria
- In office 804–805
- Monarch: Harun al-Rashid
- Preceded by: Ibrahim ibn Muhammad
- Succeeded by: Yahya ibn Mu'adh ibn Muslim
- In office 809/810–813
- Monarch: Al-Amin
- Preceded by: Ahmad ibn Sa'id al-Harashi
- Succeeded by: Muhammad ibn Salih ibn Bayhas

Amir al-Hajj
- In office 785
- Monarch: Al-Hadi
- In office 793
- Monarch: Harun al-Rashid

Governor of Jazira
- Monarch: Harun al-Rashid

Governor of Basra
- Monarch: Harun al-Rashid

Personal details
- Born: 766/767 CE
- Died: 813/815
- Spouse: Azizah bint Ghitrif
- Children: Abbasa
- Parents: Abu Ja'far Abd Allah al-Mansur (father); Fatimah bint Muhammad al-Taymi (mother)
- Relatives: Al-Mahdi (half-brother); Musa al-Hadi (nephew); Al-Rashid (nephew and son-in-law)

Sulaymān ibn al-Manṣūr (Arabic: سليمان بن المنصور), better known as Sulaymān ibn Abī Jaʿfar (Arabic: سليمان بن أبي جعفر), was an Abbasid prince and served as governor of Basra, al-Jazira and Syria during the reign of his nephew, Caliph Harun al-Rashid (r. 786–809). He also served in Syria under al-Rashid's son and successor, al-Amin.

== Life ==
Sulayman was a son of the Abbasid caliph al-Mansur (r. 754–775) (whose nickname was 'Abu Ja'far') and one of his wives, Fatimah bint Muhammad al-Taymi, granddaughter of Isa ibn Talha al-Taymi, who was the son of a leading companion of the Islamic prophet Muhammad, Talha ibn Ubaydallah. Sulayman's daughter Abbasa was a wife of Caliph Harun al-Rashid (r. 786–809), the son of Sulayman's brother, Caliph al-Mahdi (r. 775–785). Under al-Mahdi's other son and immediate successor, Caliph al-Hadi (r. 785–786), Sulayman led the Hajj pilgrimage to Mecca. During al-Rashid's reign, Sulayman led the Hajj in 793, and served as the caliph's governor in Basra, al-Jazira and Syria.

Sulayman was entrusted by al-Rashid's son and successor al-Amin to secure the oaths of allegiance to his caliphate from holdouts among the elite. Al-Amin, who was also related to Sulayman through his mother, reappointed Sulayman to govern Syria around 809–810 in response to unrest in Damascus emanating from the theft of a prized crystal pitcher from the Umayyad Mosque by the incumbent governor, Sulayman's nephew Mansur ibn al-Mahdi. The outrage of the Damascenes prompted them to refuse prayer under Abbasid leadership. As governor of Syria, Sulayman was "a pillar of the 'Abbasid regime", according to the historian Wilferd Madelung.

During the Fourth Fitna, the civil war which broke out in 811 over the succession dispute between al-Amin and his brother al-Ma'mun, tribes and local magnates in many regions and cities in Syria expelled representatives of the Abbasids. In Damascus, remnants of the Umayyad dynasty, which was toppled from the caliphate by the Abbasids in 750, and their sympathizers, led by Abu al-Umaytir al-Sufyani, attacked Sulayman's in his residence, the palace of al-Hajjaj ibn Yusuf. In the run up to the revolt, Sulayman had imprisoned an Abbasid loyalist, the prominent Qaysi chief Ibn Bayhas al-Kilabi, in the same palace. Ibn Bayhas was an opponent of the Umayyads' mostly Yamani backers, rivals of the Qays. Sulayman freed Ibn Bayhas during the Umayyads' attack and Ibn Bayhas helped him escape. The Qaysi chief escorted him through the Hauran to Thaniyyat al-Uqab. From there, Sulayman made his way to Kufa in Iraq. During their escape from Syria, the Abbasid troops were attacked and pillaged by the Damascene mobs.

Upon his return to Iraq, Sulayman remained among the leading partisans of al-Amin, staying with him and his loyalist troops from the al-abna faction as they barricaded in Baghdad's City of Peace as al-Ma'mun's general, Tahir ibn al-Husayn, closed in on him. According to a narrative cited in the history of al-Tabari (d. 937), Sulayman was among those approached by Tahir to persuade al-Amin to surrender to al-Ma'mun.

== Bibliography ==
- Bosworth, C. E., ed. (1989). The History of al-Ṭabarī, Volume XXX: The ʿAbbāsid Caliphate in Equilibrium: The Caliphates of Mūsā al-Hādī and Hārūn al-Rashīd, A.D. 785–809/A.H. 169–192. SUNY Series in Near Eastern Studies. Albany, New York: State University of New York Press. ISBN 978-0-88706-564-4.
- Kennedy, Hugh, ed. (1990). The History of al-Ṭabarī, Volume XXIX: Al-Mansūr and al-Mahdī, A.D. 763–786/A.H. 146–169. SUNY Series in Near Eastern Studies. Albany, New York: State University of New York Press. ISBN 978-0-7914-0142-2.
- Fishbein, Michael, ed. (1992). The History of al-Ṭabarī, Volume XXXI: The War Between Brothers: The Caliphate of Muḥammad al-Amīn, A.D. 809–813/A.H. 193–198. SUNY Series in Near Eastern Studies. Albany, New York: State University of New York Press. ISBN 978-0-7914-1085-1.
- Madelung, Wilferd (2000). "Abūʾl ʿAmayṭar the Sufyānī". Jerusalem Studies in Arabic and Islam. 24: 327–343.
- Cobb, Paul M. (2001). White Banners: Contention in 'Abbasid Syria, 750–880. SUNY Press. ISBN 978-0-7914-4880-9.
