= Al-Arji =

Abd Allah ibn Umar ibn Amr ibn Uthman al-Arji (Note: Arabic: أبو عمر عبد الله بن عمر بن عمرو بن عثمان العرجي, romanized: Abū ʿUmar ʿAbd Allāh ibn ʿUmar ibn ʿAmr ibn ʿUthmān al-ʿArjī) (d. 737, 738 or 741 CE) was one of the best known poets of the Umayyad family, descended from the line of Caliph Uthman (r. 644–656). His poetry belonged the ghazal (romantic love) and satire genres. Al-Arji was based in Medina and was imprisoned by its governor for, among other reasons, lampooning him and his womenfolk. After several years, he died in jail.

== Family ==
Al-Arji's father, Umar, was a son of the nobleman Amr ibn Uthman of Medina (and grandson of Caliph Uthman) and one of Amr's umm walads (slave concubines). Al-Arji's mother, Amina, was a daughter of Umar ibn Uthman (and thus a granddaughter of Caliph Uthman). Al-Arji's only known wife was his first cousin, Uthayma (also called Umm Uthman). She was the daughter of his paternal uncle, al-Bukayr ibn Amr ibn Uthman, and the latter's wife Sukayna, daughter of Mus'ab ibn al-Zubayr, the viceroy of Iraq for the anti-Umayyad Zubayrid caliphate. From his marriage to Uthayma, al-Arji had two sons, Umar and Zayd, the former of whom was killed fighting with the Medinan forces against the Kharijites at the Battle of Qudayd in 747.

== Life ==
Al-Arji gained his epithet after his estate in al-Arj, a grove land in the tribal territory of the Banu Aslam near Ta'if, in the southern environs of Medina. He participated in the military campaigns of Maslama ibn Abd al-Malik against the Byzantine Empire during the reign of Maslama's brother, Caliph Sulayman (r. 715–717). The latter belonged to the Marwanid line of the Umayyad family, which ruled the Caliphate from 684 to 750; Caliph Uthman's descendants like al-Arji belonged to a different line of the Umayyad family.

Despite his efforts, al-Arji was unable to attain any official post. He retired to the Hejaz, spending his days between al-Arj and Mecca. According to Charles Pellat, al-Arji, now living a life of "idleness" like other Hejazi aristocrats, "turned to amusements, frivolous or riotous", joining the ranks of the erotic poets who were "flourishing" in the region at that time. According to Hilary Kilpatrick, al-Arji "preferred hunting and living the life of a country notable to public life". He became a prominent poet, one of the best known from the Umayyad family. He specialized in the ghazal (romantic love) and satire genres, and was generally considered the 'successor' of the well-known Qurayshite ghazal poet of Medina, Umar ibn Abi Rabi'a, after the latter died in 719.

During the reign of Sulayman's brother Hisham (r. 724–743), al-Arji's relations with his caliphal cousins deteriorated. He was imprisoned by Hisham's governor of Medina, Ibrahim ibn Hisham ibn Isma'il al-Makhzumi or his brother Muhammad. Different reasons for his imprisonment are cited in the early Islamic tradition, namely that he consumed wine, killed his own mawla (client or freedman), and/or that he lampooned the governor. Al-Arji's satirical verses relayed that the governor was unworthy of leading the annual Hajj pilgrimage to Mecca, and included love poems, which were turned into songs, addressed to the governor's mother and wife. (Note: Al-Arji's love poem to the governor's mother: Turn toward me, mistress of the howdah; if you do not do so, you will commit a crime. The easiest gift a lover can offer upon the departure of his beloved, is to say: "Turn aside," That his need be granted, or to say: "Can I escape my suffering?" You have departed from your lover, but the passion in the heart of one deeply in love; by love exhausted, will not depart.") Al-Arji was tortured and humiliated in prison, where he died after several years. His death year is variously cited as 120 AH/737 CE, 121 AH/738 CE, and 124 AH/741 CE.

== Poetry ==
In Kilpatrick's view, al-Arji was "irritable, but proverbial for his generosity"; he lacked the poetic brilliance of Umar ibn Abi Rabi'a and the provacativeness of his distant Umayyad kinsman al-Walid ibn Uqba but his verses were "more memorable" than other Umayyad family poets. Taha Husayn described him as "a righteous man who disliked those in authority, and both his bluntness and dislike destroyed him". Al-Arji's poems were mostly addressed to women whose company he sought, including one woman he encountered during the Hajj, and also the women of his foes and poetic rivals as a means to taunt them.

Many of al-Arji's poem's were turned into songs and preserved in later works, including the 10th-century Kitab al-aghani ('Book of Songs') by Abu al-Faraj al-Isfahani. Some singers played his poetry to counter opposition to music. His verses were sung in the courts of the Abbasid caliphs (who ruled the caliphate from 750 to 1258) and one such song was named by the prominent 10th-century singer Jahza al-Barmaki as one of his 'Top Three'.

The 17th-century al-Hasan al-Yusi preserved one of al-Arji's verses:

They ignored me, and any young man ignored by them
feels the calamity of his tongue being silenced.
As if I were not a mediator among them
nor descended from the family of ʿAmr [ibn Uthman].

== Bibliography ==
- Ahmed, Asad Q. (2011). The Religious Elite of the Early Islamic Ḥijāz: Five Prosopographical Case Studies. Oxford: University of Oxford Linacre College Unit for Prosopographical Research. ISBN 978-1-900934-13-8.
- Kilpatrick, Hilary (2010). "ʿUmar ibn ʿAbd al-ʿAzīz, al-Walīd ibn Yazīd and their Kin: Images of the Umayyads in the Kitāb al-Aghānī". In Borrut, Antoine; Cobb, Paul M. (eds.). Umayyad Legacies: Medieval Memories from Syria to Spain. Leiden and Boston: Brill. pp. 63–88. ISBN 9789004184749.
- Al-Hasan al-Yusi (2019). Kennedy, Philip F.; Toorawa, Shawkat M. (eds.). The Discourses: Reflections on History, Sufism, Theology, and Literature: Volume 1. Translated by Justin Stearns. New York: New York University Press. ISBN 9780814764572.
- Monroe, James T. (2017). The Mischievous Muse: Extant Poetry and Prose by Ibn Quzmān of Córdoba (d. AH 555/AD 1160). Leiden: Brill. ISBN 978-90-04-33922-4.
- Pellat, Ch. (1960). "al-Ardjī". In Gibb, H. A. R.; Kramers, J. H.; Lévi-Provençal, E.; Schacht, J.; Lewis, B. & Pellat, Ch. (eds.). The Encyclopaedia of Islam, Second Edition. Volume I: A–B. Leiden: E. J. Brill. pp. 626–627. OCLC 495469456.
