= Nadr ibn al-Harith =

Arab Physician (d. 624 CE)

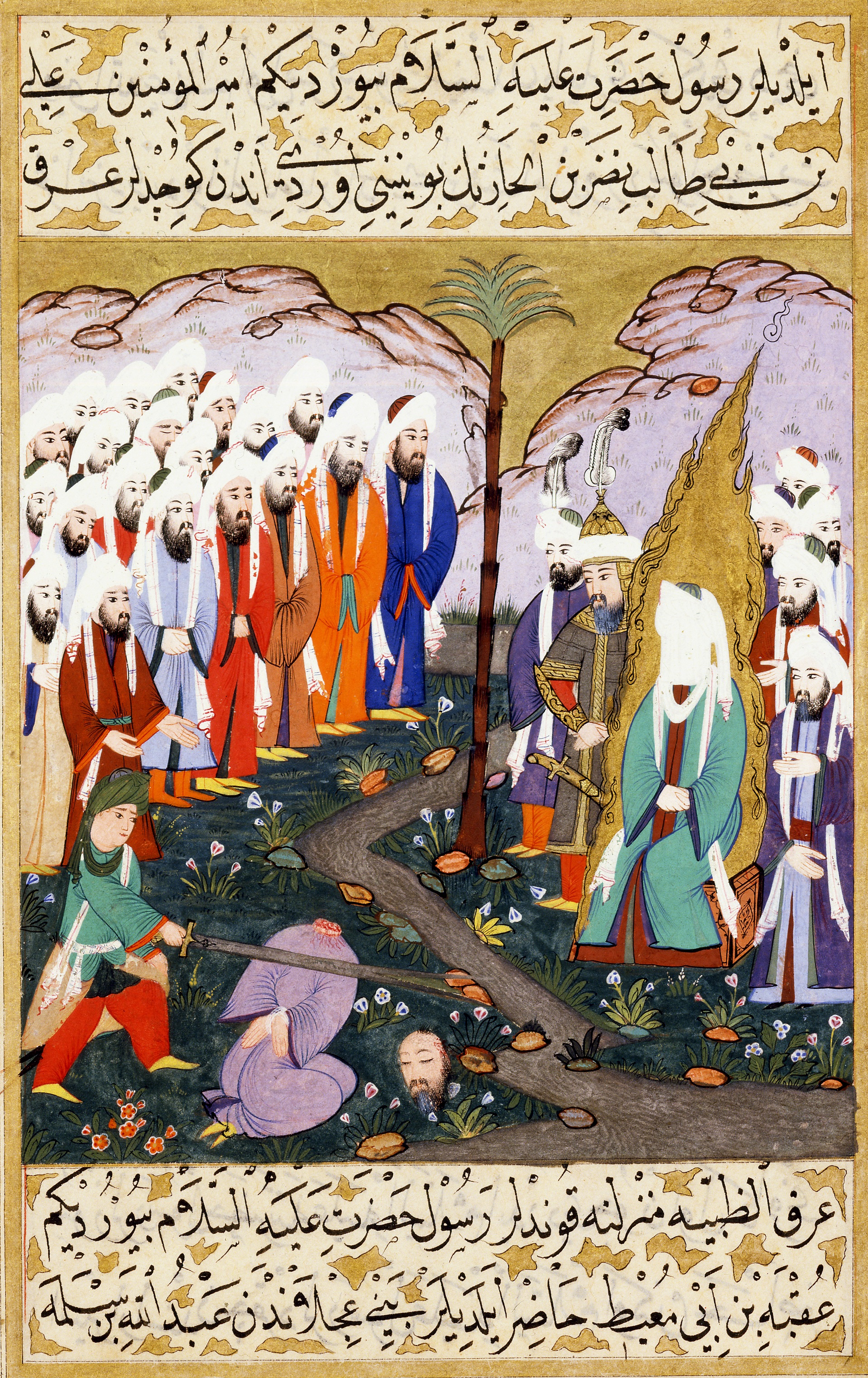
A 16th-century miniature from Siyer-i Nebi depicting Ali beheading Nadr ibn al-Harith in the presence of Muhammad and his companions

Nadr ibn al-Harith ibn Alqama ibn Kalada ibn Abd al-Manaf ibn Abd al-Dar ibn Qusayy (Arabic: نضر بن الحارث, romanized: Naḍr ibn al-Ḥārith) was an Arab physician who is considered one of the greatest Qurayshi opponents to the Islamic prophet Muhammad. He was captured after the Battle of Badr as one of the pagan fighters and flag-bearers. He was sentenced to death for his participation and persecution of Muhammed and Muslims in Mecca. The execution was conducted by Ali by beheading him in front of Muhammad and his companions at as-Safra' before they had returned to Medina from the battle.

According to the Sīrah, two captives, Nadr ibn al-Harith and Uqbah ibn Abi Mu'ayt, were executed during this event, the former by Ali and the latter by Asim ibn Thabit. According to Professor Sarah Bowen Savant, the event is claimed to have inspired Nadr's sister, Qutayla ukht al-Nadr, to compose an elegy on his death, upbraiding Muhammad for the execution.

== Life ==
During the Meccan period, Nadr ibn alharits was known as one of the authors a document advocating for the boycott of the small Muslim community by withholding the sale of any goods, effectively leading to their starvation. He is also considered one of the greatest opponents to the Islamic prophet Muhammad and his message during the Meccan era, and a propeller of their persecution. Per Islamic traditionalists like Muqatil ibn Sulayman, Al-Nadr had also accused Muhammad of plagiarism in his Quranic verses based on the stories of ancient people.

Al-Nadr was captured after the Battle of Badr after his army was defeated in their offensive and was executed for his participation and involvements in Meccan persecutions. Mohar Ali also names Al-Nadr as one of the assassins who tried to kill Muhammad before he migrated to Medina. British Orientalist David Samuel Margoliouth, however, claims that he was executed for his challenge and ridiculing Muhammad, and that this version is supported by some ninth and tenth-century Muslim sources, including al-Tabari, who cites an oral report of Muhammad justifying his order on the basis of Nadr accusing him. Al-Waqidi mentions a report that when Nadr asked the Muslims why he was to be executed, they replied that it was for his persecuting and torturing the Muslim as well as ridiculing the Quran.

== Quran verse about the beheading of an-Nadir bin al-Harith ==
In Ibn Kathir's book "Tafsir Ibn Kathir", he claims in his tafsir that the verse Quran 8:31 was revealed about Nadir bin al-Harith, despite no direct mention of him or his execution in the Quran itself. Ibn Kathir's commentary on Quran 8:31 and Quran 8:5 is as follows:

An-Nadr visited Persia and learned the stories of some Persian kings, such as Rustum and Isphandiyar. When he went back to Makkah, he found that the Prophet was reciting the ayats of Qur'an sent from Allah to the people. Whenever the Prophet would leave an audience in which an-Nadr was sitting, an-Nadr began narrating to them the stories that he learned in Persia, proclaiming afterwards, Who, by Allah, has better tales to narrate, I or Muhammad. When Allah allowed the Muslims to capture an-Nadr in Badr, the Messenger of Allah commanded that his head be cut off before him, and that was done, all thanks are due to Allah. The meaning of,

(...tales of the ancients)

[Tafsir Ibn Kathir, on Quran 8:31]

In addition, the actual execution and death of, the Prophet's nemesis, al-Nadr bin al-Harith, is attested to in the Sunnah Hadith tradition;

"She told that when God’s Messenger took prisoners of the people at Badr, he killed ‘Uqba b. Aba Mu'ait and an-Nadr ibn al-Harith, but showed favour to Abu ‘Azza al-Jumahi." (It is transmitted in Sharh as Sunna) [Mishkat al-Masabih, Hadith No. 3971]

== "A questioner" ==
According to several highly regarded tafsirs, al-Nadr ibn al-Harith, is described in Surah Al-Maʻārij (Arabic: المعارج, "The Ascents") [Quran 70:1–3] as;

"A questioner asked about a Penalty to befall, The Unbelievers, the which there is none to ward off, (A Penalty) from Allah, Lord of the Ways of Ascent..." [Quran 70:1-3]

In the commentary (tafsir), of ibn Abbas (Tanwir al-Miqbas min Tafsir ibn Abbas), al-Nadr ibn al-Harith, is specifically named as being "A questioner". Thus, he is portrayed as a fierce, unrelenting critic and a challenger to the Prophet Muhammad, and the Quran, during the Prophet's early Meccan ministry;

"And from his narration on the authority of Ibn 'Abbas that he said regarding the interpretation of Allah's saying (A questioner questioned): '(A questioner questioned) a caller: i.e. al-Nadr Ibn al-Harith, called (concerning the doom about to fall upon the disbelievers) while he is himself a disbeliever, (which none can repel) and so he was killed in captivity on the Day of Badr."

Al-Nadr bin al Harith, is also described as being the "a petitioner"/"a supplicator" of Quran 70:1, by the commentary Tafsir al-Jalalayn:

"A petitioner petitioned, a supplicator supplicated [for], an impending chastisement— which in the case of the disbelievers none can avert: this was al-Nadr b. al-Hārith, who [also] said, ‘O God, if this be indeed the truth from You …then rain down upon us stones from the heaven’ [Q. 8:32]."

== See also ==
- Hejaz
- List of expeditions of Muhammad
- Qutayla ukht al-Nadr
