= Siyer-i Nebi =

Turkish epic about the life of Muhammad

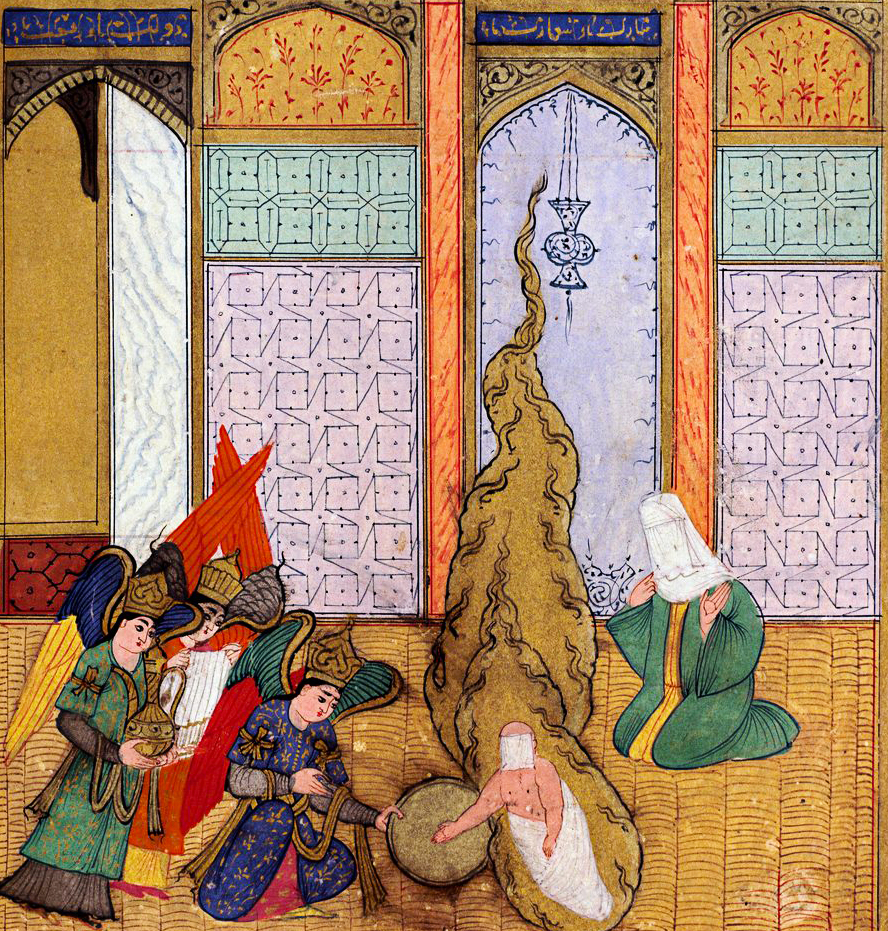
- The birth of Muhammad in the Siyer-i-Nebi

Information
- Religion: Islam
- Author: Mustafa of Erzurum
- Language: Ottoman Turkish
- Period: Era of Transformation

Siyer-i Nebi (Ottoman Turkish: سیر نبی) is an Ottoman epic on the life of the Islamic prophet Muhammad, completed around 1388, written by Mustafa (son of Yusuf of Erzurum, known as al-Darir), a Mevlevi dervish on the commission of Sultan Barquq, the Mamluk ruler in Cairo. The text is based on the 13th-century writings of Abu’l Hasan al-Bakri and Ibn Hisham (d. 833). This epic would later be illustrated by Mustafa ibn Vali in the late 16th century, as commissioned by his patron, Sultan Murad III.

== Ottoman manuscript ==
The Ottoman ruler Murad III (1574–1595) commissioned a lavish illustrated copy of the epic, which has been described as "the largest single cycle of religious painting in Islamic art" and "the most complete visual portrayal of the life of the prophet Muhammad". The famous calligrapher Lutfi Abdullah (Lütfi Abdullah) was in charge of the workshop at the royal palace, and completed the work under Murad's successor Mehmed III, on 16 January 1595. The completed work contained 814 miniatures in six volumes, which include many depictions of Muhammad, who is always shown with a veiled face, as was the convention during the time period; he is also surrounded by flames, which is the eastern equivalent of a halo. The style of the miniatures is distinctive, and owes nothing to earlier treatments of these subjects, as well as being "strikingly different" to the normal realist style of Ottoman miniatures; its origins remain unclear. There are a few figures in each scene, no extensive landscapes, and a "suppression of detail".

Volumes I, II and VI are in the Topkapı Palace (Hazine 1221–1223); Volume III is in the New York Public Library; Volume IV is (mostly) in the Chester Beatty Library in Dublin (MS T 419), and Volume V is missing, as are about 200 of the miniatures in total. About two dozen of the miniatures are in the hands of private [collectors. Four were sold at the Hôtel Drouot auction house in Paris in March 1984. Two folios from Volume IV are in the Khalili Collection of Islamic Art.

A 17th-century copy of Volume IV, made in the court atelier, is in the Turkish and Islamic Arts Museum in Fatih. It was donated to a mosque library in Aksaray, Fatih, by the Sultan's mother in 1862–1863.

== Images gallery ==
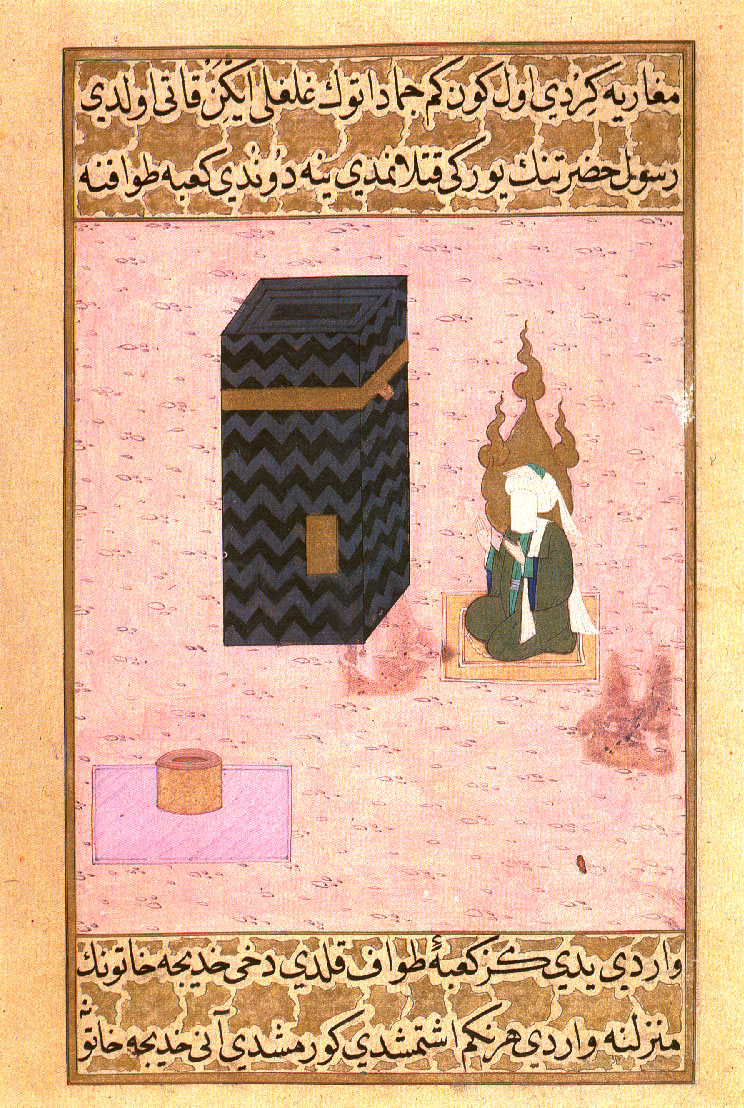
Muhammad at the Kaaba

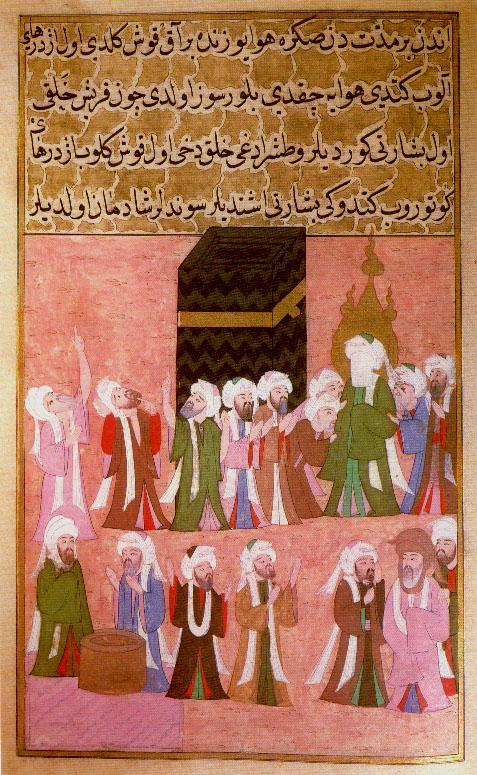
Muhammad removes a dragon from the Kaaba

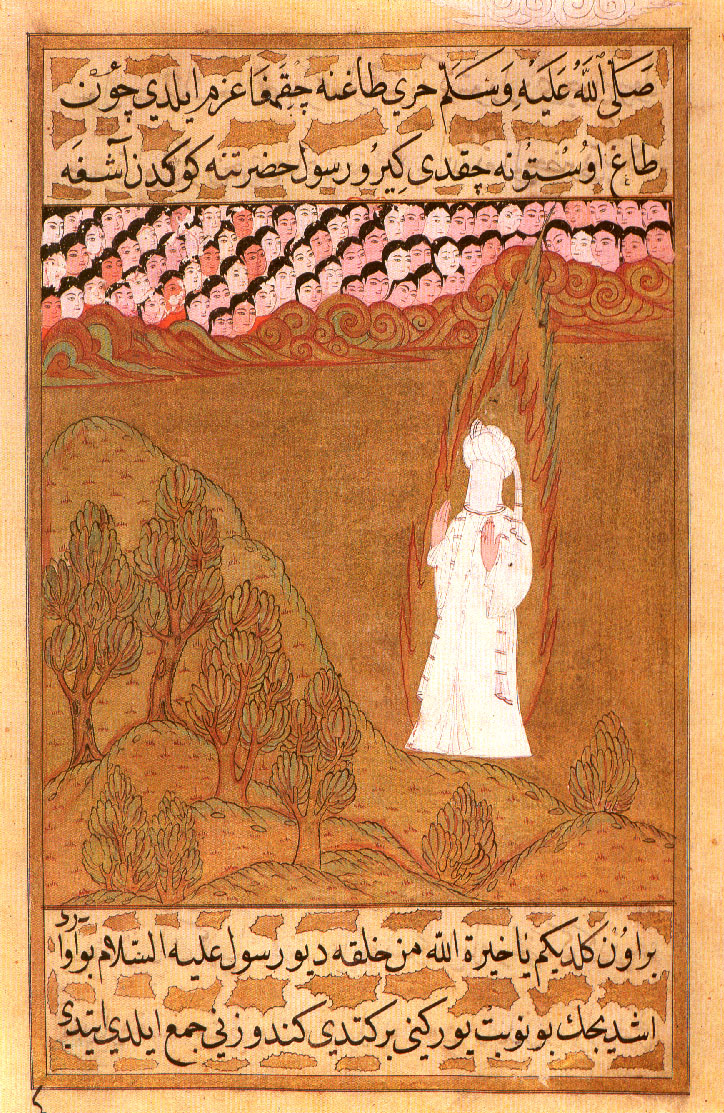
Muhammad at Mount Hira

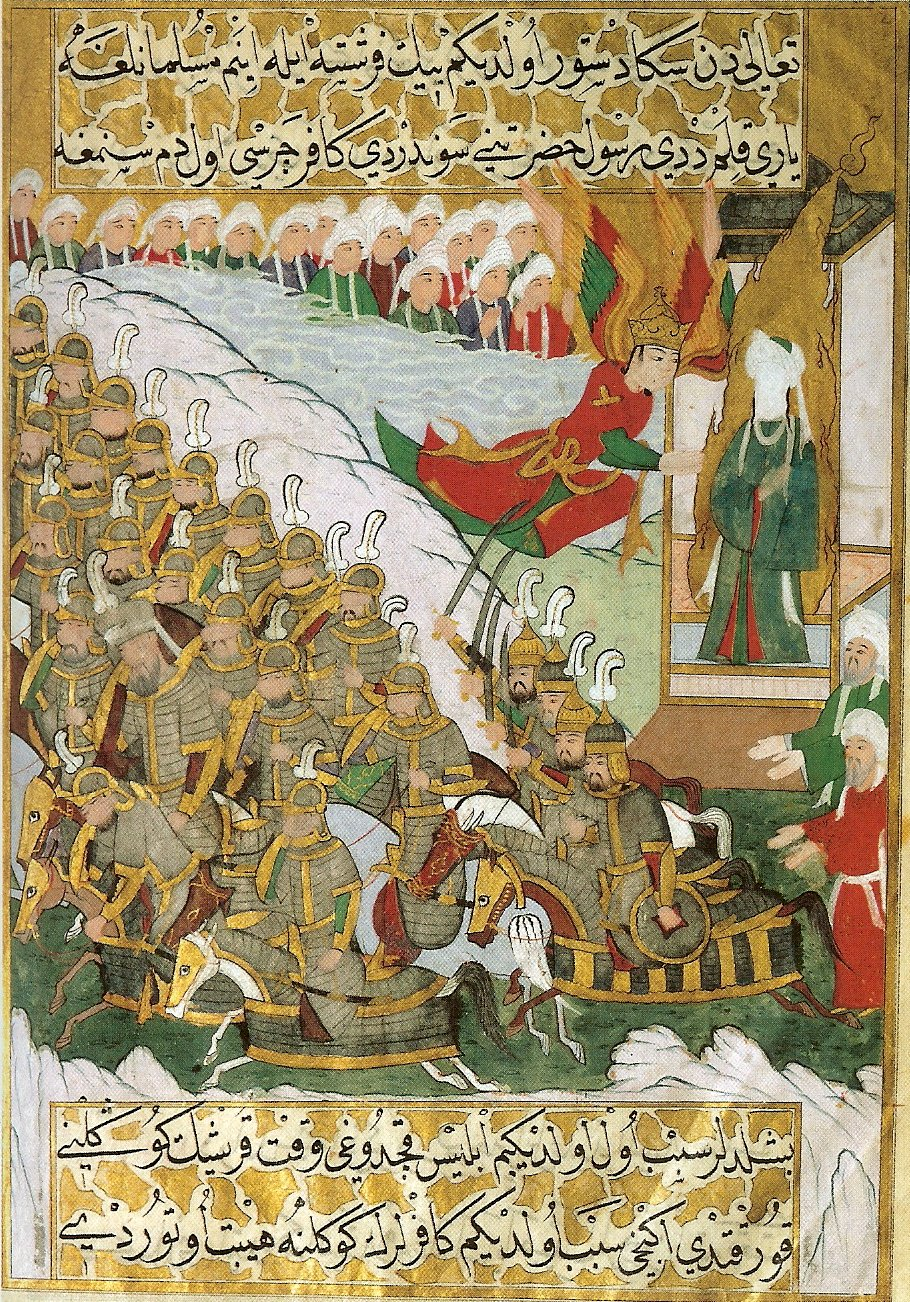
Muhammad at the Battle of Badr

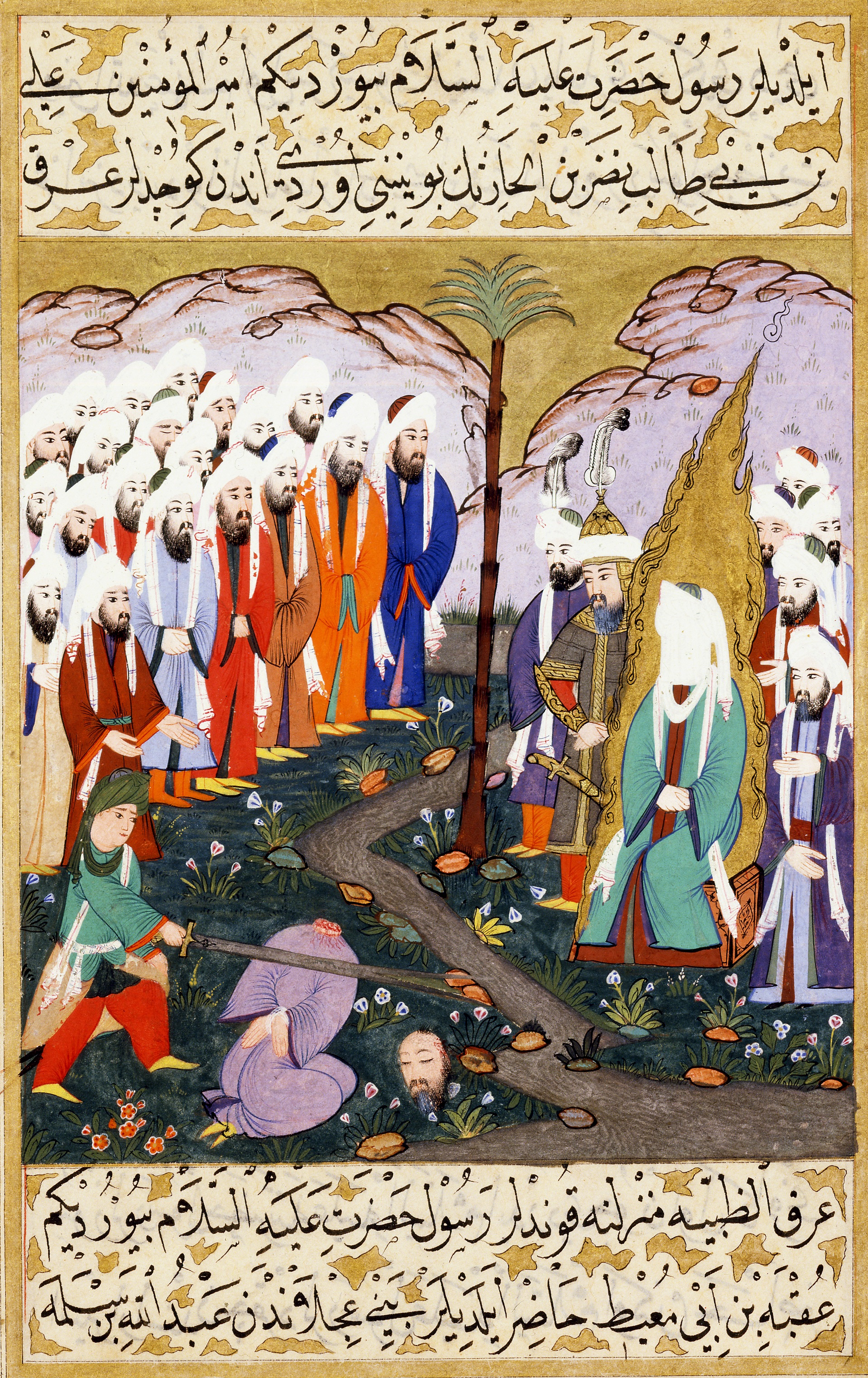
Ali beheading Nadr ibn al-Harith in the presence of Muhammad and his companions

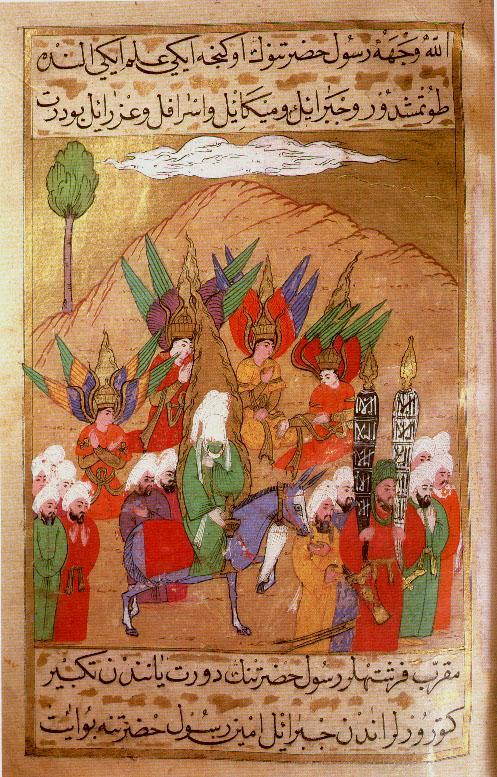
Muhammad advancing on Mecca, with the angels Gabriel, Michael, Israfil and Azrael

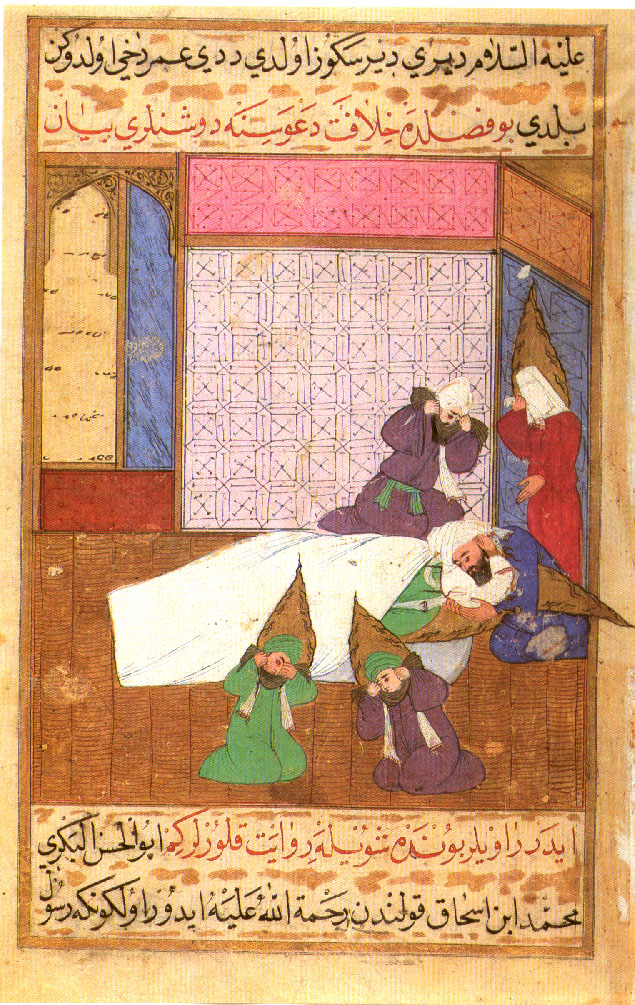
Death of Muhammad

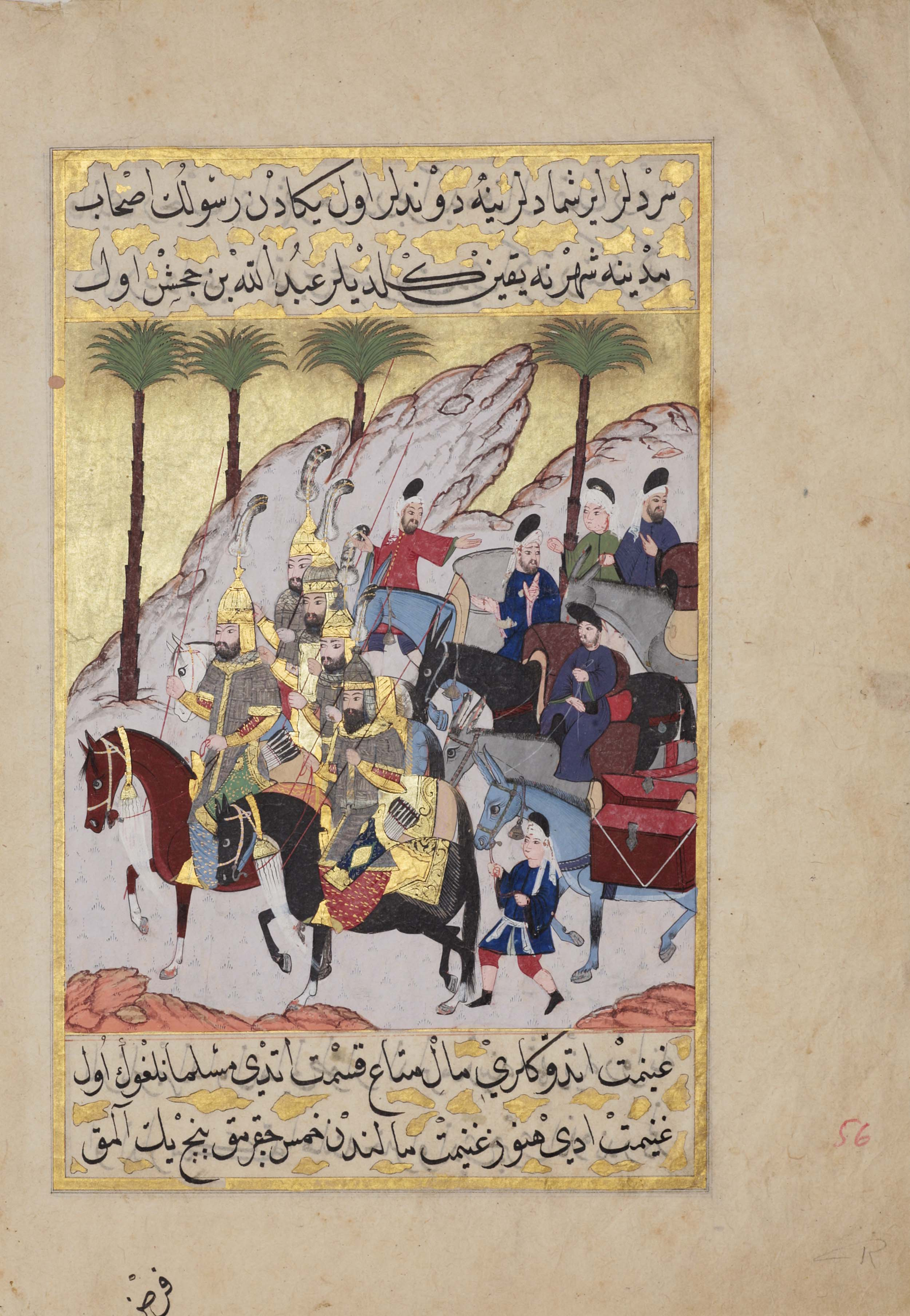
A caravan, headed by ‘Abdallah ibn Jahsh, returns to Medina from a raid by companions of Muhammad.

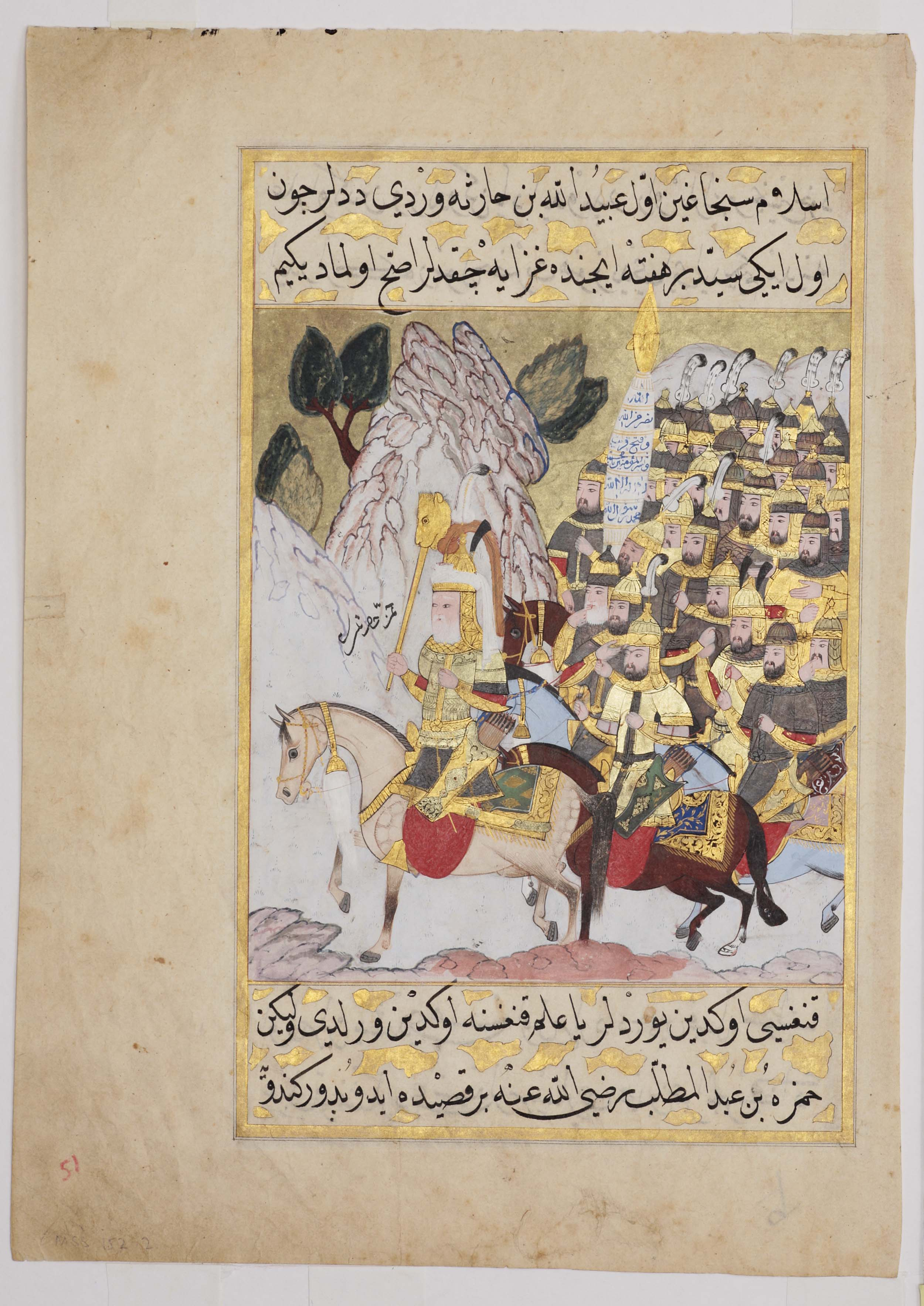
‘Ubayd ibn Harith and Hamza ibn ‘Abd al-Muttalib lead troops against Abu Jahl

== See also ==
- Qisas al-Anbiya
