= Qutayla ukht al-Nadr =

7th-century Arabic poet

Qutayla bint al-Nadr
- قُتيلة أخت النضر
- Born: 7th century Arabia
- Died: 7th century
- Occupation: Poet
- Writing career
- Language: Arabic
- Notable work: Elegy for Nadr ibn al-Harith

Qutayla ukht al-Nadr (Arabic: قُتيلة أخت النضر, or Qutayla bint al-Nadr) was a seventh-century CE Arab woman of the Quraysh tribe, noted as one of the earliest attested Arabic-language poets on account of her famous elegy for Nadr ibn al-Harith.

== Life ==
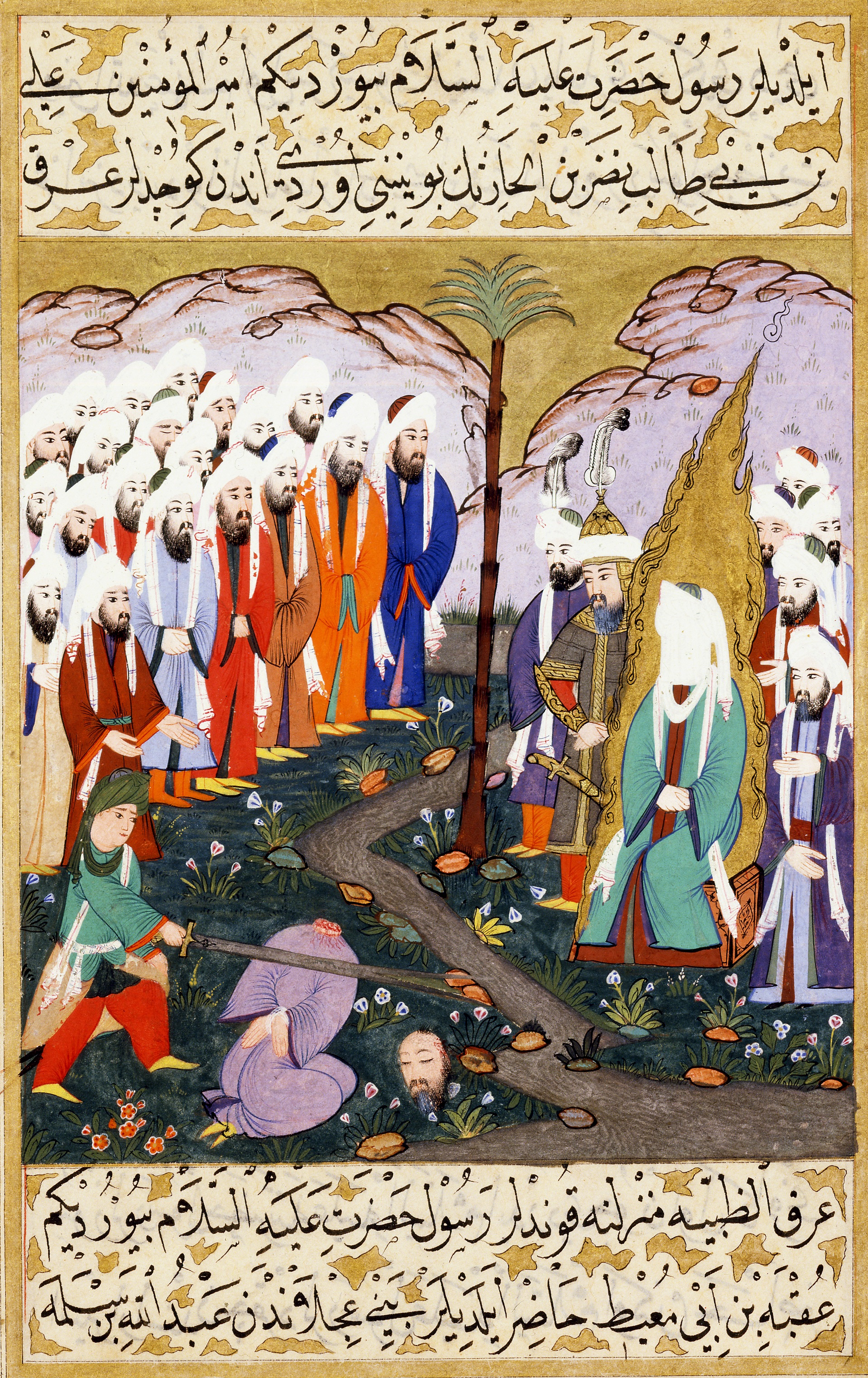
A painting from Siyer-i Nebi, Ali beheading Nadr ibn al-Harith in the presence of Muhammad and his companions.

Qutayla appears in the historical record in connection with her relative Nadr ibn al-Harith, an Arab Pagan doctor from Taif, who used to tell stories of Rustam and Esfandiyār to the Arabs and scoffed the Islamic prophet Muhammad. After the battle of Badr in 624 CE, al-Harith was captured and, in retaliation, Muhammad ordered his execution in hands of Ali. Some sources characterise Qutayla as Nadr's sister (ukht), others as his daughter (bint), though the most popular claim seems to be that she was his sister (hence the title of this article). Her full name appears in some sources, for example, as Qutayla ukht al-Nuḍar b. al-Ḥarīth b. ‘Alqama b. Kalda b. ‘Abd Manāf b. ‘Abd al-Dār b. QuṠayy al-Qurashiyya al-‘Abdariyya. There was also a tradition, attested in one medieval source, al-Jāḥiẓ in his Kitāb al-Bayān wa ’l-tabyīn, that she was actually called Laylā.

== Work ==
To Qutayla is attributed the following elegy for Nadr, in which she upbraids Muhammad for the execution. According to some commentaries, Muhammad's response to this was 'Had I heard her verses before I put him to death, I should not have done so'.

On the fifth night's morning, stranger, with luck
a tamarisk tree should appear by the way:
Leave word that travellers never cease
as they pass to wave a salute from the road;
that you saw me standing, the tears on my face;
on other tears, unseen, I choke.
Will my brother hear my voice when I call?
If the dead can hear they never speak.
Weary and worn he was led to his doom,
a captive dragging his feet in chains,
torn by the swords of his cousins and kin:
To God I mourn the divided house.
Muḥammad, of noble woman born,
son of equally noble sire!
It would not have harmed to be generous then;
a man, incensed, may still forgive.
Had you taken ransom -- Nothing too much,
too grand, but we'd gladly have given it up.
My brother was nearest of those you took,
the first to be spared -- had you pardoned his youth.

'Although doubt has been expressed regarding their authenticity ... these verses, frequently cited and highly appreciated, have perpetuated alNadr's memory'. Whatever its origin, the poem attributed to Qutayla is among the poems most frequently cited in the medieval Arabic anthologies known as ḥamāsāt, being noted for their moving quality. In the assessment of Nadia Maria El Cheikh, 'Qutayla's poem reflects the new Islamic ethos conveying the dramatic tension of a particular moment in Islamic religious history. She does not call for vengeance but for a modification of behavior, a kind retroactive display of restraint and forbearance'.
