= Alid revolt of 762–763 =

Revolt in the Abbasid Caliphate

Date	September 762 – February 763
Location	Hejaz and southern Iraq
Result	Abbasid victory

Belligerents
Abbasid Caliphate	Alids

Commanders and leaders
al-Mansur; Isa ibn Musa	Muhammad al-Nafs al-Zakiyya †; Ibrahim ibn Abdallah (DOW)

The Alid revolt of 762–763 or Revolt of Muhammad the Pure Soul was an uprising by the Hasanid branch of the Alids against the newly established Abbasid Caliphate. The Hasanids, led by the brothers Muhammad (called "the Pure Soul") and Ibrahim, rejected the legitimacy of the Abbasid family's claim to power. Reacting to mounting persecution by the Abbasid regime, in 762 they launched a rebellion, with Muhammad rising in revolt at Medina in September and Ibrahim following in Basra in November.

The Hasanids' lack of co-ordination and organization, as well as the lukewarm support of their followers, allowed the Abbasids under Caliph al-Mansur to react swiftly. The Caliph contained Muhammad's rebellion in the Hejaz and crushed it only two weeks after Ibrahim's uprising, before turning his forces against the latter. Ibrahim's rebellion had achieved some initial successes in southern Iraq, but his camp was torn by dissent among rival Shi'a groups as to the prosecution of the war and future political objectives. In the end, Ibrahim's army was decisively defeated at Bakhamra in January 763, with Ibrahim dying of his wounds shortly after.

The failure of the rebellion did not mark the end of Alid unrest, but it consolidated the power of the Abbasid dynasty.

== Background ==
Following the death of Muhammad in 632, a strong body of opinion within the nascent Muslim community—the antecedents of the Shi'a—held the Family of Muhammad (Al Muhammad) to be the only rightful leaders, who would have the divine guidance necessary to rule according to the Quran and bring justice. These sentiments were fed by the increasing discontent against the Umayyad dynasty, which ruled the Caliphate from 661 until 750. Initially, they were expressed by a succession of failed risings—most notably the Battle of Karbala in 680 and the uprising of Zayd ibn Ali in 740—in support of various Alid claimants, i.e. the descendants of Ali, the cousin and son-in-law of Muhammad and fourth Caliph (r. 656–661), whose death had marked the rise of the Umayyad family to power. Iraq and Kufa in particular became centres of pro-Alid support. It was the Abbasids, however, and their supporters, the Hashimiyya, who launched the revolution that overthrew the Umayyad regime. The Abbasids claimed authority based on their membership in the extended Al Muhammad through Muhammad's uncle Abbas ibn Abd al-Muttalib; unlike later Shi'a doctrine, membership of the Family was not strictly limited to the Alids at that time, but encompassed the entire Banu Hashim. The Abbasids were able to exploit the weakening of the Alid cause after Zayd's failure in 740, as well as the widespread anti-Umayyad sentiment and lack of pro-Alid agitation among the numerous Arab settlers of Khurasan, to gain their backing and secure the leadership of the anti-Umayyad movement for themselves. Nevertheless, in the first stages of their uprising, they were careful not to antagonize the Alids' supporters, and merely called for a "chosen one from the Family of Muhammad" (al-rida min Al Muhammad) to become the new Muslim leader.

Following their takeover of the Caliphate, the Abbasids tried to ensure the Alids' acquiescence through honours and pensions. However, some Alids remained opposed to Abbasid rule, going into hiding and once again trying to rouse the discontented against the new regime. Chief among them were Muhammad ibn Abdallah and his brother Ibrahim. Both had been groomed by their father as leaders since their youth, and some sources even claim that he had received the bay'ah (oath of allegiance) of the Hashimiyya leaders, including the future Caliph al-Mansur (r. 754–775), in 744, before the Abbasid Revolution. Muhammad was often called "the Pure Soul" (al-Nafs al-Zakiyya) for his noble character, but he was also "a somewhat unworldly, even romantic, individual" (Hugh N. Kennedy) and apparently less capable or learned than his younger brother Ibrahim. When the Abbasids took power, the two brothers refused to accept what they regarded as the usurpation of their legitimate rights and went into hiding. From there they continued their work of proselytism, which reportedly brought them as far as the Sindh, although mostly they stayed in Arabia. The first Abbasid caliph, al-Saffah (r. 750–754), was content to mostly ignore their activities, but his successor al-Mansur launched a manhunt against them. In 758, al-Mansur arrested their brother Abdallah when he refused to reveal their whereabouts, followed in early 762 by their cousins and nephews. The captive Alids were taken to Kufa, where they were so mistreated that many of them died. Among the prisoners, Muhammad ibn Abdallah al-Dibaj, a descendant of Caliph Uthman (r. 644–656) and maternal half-brother to Muhammad's and Ibrahim's father, received the harshest treatment for allegedly concealing from al-Mansur the whereabouts of Muhammad and Ibrahim.

== Muhammad's revolt in Medina ==
As al-Mansur's persecution intensified, pressure began to mount on the brothers to react. Kufa, the traditional Alid base, was kept under close surveillance by the Abbasid government, and the two brothers resolved to launch a simultaneous rebellion in Basra and Medina. Although the Alids could count on a large network of sympathizers throughout the Caliphate, the action was rushed and lacked organization.

On 25 September 762, Muhammad declared himself at Medina, catching the Abbasid governor, Riyah ibn Uthman, by surprise. The rebellion was bloodless and Muhammad quickly gained the support of the old Muslim families of Medina and Mecca (the Ansar), but the movement had been doomed from the start: despite Medina's great symbolic value, it had little strategic importance, and the error of using it as the centre of a rebellion became apparent when the Abbasids immediately cut off the grain supply from Egypt that fed the city. Al-Mansur himself was relieved at the news of the uprising in such a remote location, remarking that at last he had "enticed the fox out of his hole". Al-Mansur left Baghdad, whose construction he was supervising, for Kufa. From there he called upon Muhammad to surrender, promising an amnesty. The only fruit of this offer was an exchange of letters, which are preserved (though doubtlessly much embellished) by al-Tabari. In them, Muhammad reiterated his claim to leading the Muslims, and stressed his descent from Ali and Fatima, Muhammad's daughter, as well as his typically Shi'a ideals of rejecting the absolutist monarchical traditions of the Umayyads—now adopted by the Abbasids—in favour of returning to the simpler practices of early Islam. Al-Mansur countered by invoking the pre-Islamic tradition of inheritance, which gave priority to a man's male relatives over his daughters—implying that the Caliphate had passed to the Abbasid line by right.

Isa ibn Musa, the Caliph's nephew, was sent against Medina with 4,000 men, but Muhammad refused to abandon the holy city and insisted on meeting the Abbasid attack there. In the meantime, he imitated the actions of Muhammad, like restoring the famous ditch around the city. Muhammad's supporters nevertheless began deserting him. When Isa appeared before the city, he waited a few days before the ditch and repeatedly offered amnesty. Then his troops laid a few doors over the ditch and entered Medina, where Muhammad and his remaining 300 supporters fell fighting on 6 December 762. Muhammad's corpse was beheaded and his head dispatched to the Caliph.

== Ibrahim's uprising in Basra ==
Due to Muhammad's rushed actions, Ibrahim failed to co-ordinate his uprising with his brother's, and only declared himself two weeks before Muhammad's death, on 23 November. Ibrahim's revolt at first met with quick success, securing control over Ahwaz, Fars and Wasit, and his army register (diwan) was said to number 100,000 names. When the news of Muhammad's death arrived, the rebels acclaimed Ibrahim as his successor. Ibrahim now was faced with a choice: a group of dedicated Alid supporters, which had managed to escape from Kufa, urged him to march on the city, while the Basrans preferred to stay in place and reach a negotiated settlement. This dissension is indicative of the disparate nature of Ibrahim's supporters. The Alid cause was fractured into several competing groups with different political objectives, and Ibrahim represented the Hasanid branch only. The Husaynids refused to take part in an uprising, while Ibrahim quarrelled with the Zaydi branch on everything from political objectives and leadership to the tactics to be followed or the provisioning of their troops. Elsewhere, support for the uprising was cautious and most Alid supporters adopted a wait-and-see attitude, limiting themselves to verbal support or contributions of money.

Al-Mansur in the meantime used his time more effectively: he mobilized troops in Syria and Iran and brought them to Iraq, and recalled Isa ibn Musa from Medina to lead them. Finally, Ibrahim decided to march on Kufa, but on the way he abandoned this plan and turned back. Instead of returning to Basra, however, he encamped at Bakhamra, a location on the road between the two cities. There, on 21 January, Ibrahim with his troops, reduced by defections to some 15,000 men, confronted the Abbasid army under Isa ibn Musa. Isa's vanguard was at first beaten, but the battle ended in a crushing Abbasid victory. Ibrahim himself was severely wounded and escaped with a handful of supporters. He died of his wounds on 14 February 763, signalling the end of the rebellion.

== Aftermath ==
The failure and brutal suppression of Muhammad and Ibrahim's revolt was followed by a large-scale reprisal campaign against the Alids, many of whom were imprisoned or killed, until the death of al-Mansur brought about another period of attempts at conciliation under al-Mahdi (r. 775–785), which ended after another Alid uprising in 786. The relationship of the Abbasids with the Alids remained troubled: periods of repression, usually following pro-Alid revolts, were alternated with periods of relative tolerance. Although al-Ma'mun (r. 813–833) at one point nominated an Alid, Ali ibn Musa al-Rida, as his heir during the Fourth Fitna, this move was not followed up, and under Ma'mun's successors, the two families became completely estranged. Of Muhammad's sons and brothers, many fled the Abbasid persecution to the remoter corners of the Caliphate, where they sometimes succeeded in establishing local dynasties, e.g. the Idrisids of Morocco, founded by Muhammad's brother Idris, or the Alavids in Tabaristan.

== Sources ==
- Buhl, F. (1993). "Muḥammad b. ʿAbd Allāh". In Bosworth, C. E.; van Donzel, E.; Heinrichs, W. P. & Pellat, Ch. (eds.). The Encyclopaedia of Islam, Second Edition. Volume VII: Mif–Naz. Leiden: E. J. Brill. pp. 388–389. ISBN 978-90-04-09419-2.
- Cobb, Paul M. (2010). "The empire in Syria, 705–763". In Robinson, Chase F. (ed.). The New Cambridge History of Islam, Volume 1: The Formation of the Islamic World, Sixth to Eleventh Centuries. Cambridge: Cambridge University Press. pp. 226–268. ISBN 978-0-521-83823-8.
- Elad, Amikam (2015). The Rebellion of Muḥammad al-Nafs al-Zakiyya in 145/762: Ṭālibīs and Early ʿAbbāsīs in Conflict. Leiden: Brill. ISBN 9789004296220.
- El-Hibri, Tayeb (2010). "The empire in Iraq, 763–861". In Robinson, Chase F. (ed.). The New Cambridge History of Islam, Volume 1: The Formation of the Islamic World, Sixth to Eleventh Centuries. Cambridge: Cambridge University Press. pp. 269–304. ISBN 978-0-521-83823-8.
- Kennedy, Hugh (2004) [1986]. The Prophet and the Age of the Caliphates: The Islamic Near East from the 6th to the 11th Century (Second ed.). Harlow: Longman. ISBN 978-0-582-40525-7.
- Lewis, B. (1960). "ʿAlids". In Gibb, H. A. R.; Kramers, J. H.; Lévi-Provençal, E.; Schacht, J.; Lewis, B. & Pellat, Ch. (eds.). The Encyclopaedia of Islam, Second Edition. Volume I: A–B. Leiden: E. J. Brill. pp. 401–403. OCLC 495469456.
- Veccia Vagleri, L. (1971). "Ibrāhīm b. ʿAbd Allāh". In Lewis, B.; Ménage, V. L.; Pellat, Ch. & Schacht, J. (eds.). The Encyclopaedia of Islam, Second Edition. Volume III: H–Iram. Leiden: E. J. Brill. pp. 983–985. OCLC 495469525.
