= Fatimah bint Muhammad al-Taymi =

8th-century Arab princess and wife of Abbasid caliph Al-Mansur

Fatimah bint Muhammad al-Taymi فاطمة بنت محمد التيمي
- Zawjat al khalifa

Wife of the Abbasid caliph
- Tenure: 765/66 – 775
- Born: 740s
- Died: Baghdad, Abbasid Caliphate
- Spouse: Al-Mansur
- Children: Sulayman ibn Abd Allah al-Mansur; Isa ibn Abd Allah al-Mansur; Ya'qub ibn Abd Allah al-Mansur
Names
- Umm Sulayman Fatimah bint Muhammad al-Taymi
- House: Banu Taym (by birth); Abbasid (by marriage)
- Father: Muhammad al-Taymi
- Religion: Islam

Fāṭimah bint Muḥammad al-Taymī (Arabic: فاطمة بنت محمد التيمي) was the third influential wife of the Abbasid caliph al-Mansur. She was the mother of famous prince Sulayman.

== Biography ==
Fatimah belonged to Banu Taym clan of the Quraysh. She was also known as 'Fatimah al-Talhi'. Before her marriage to Caliph al-Mansur, her husband was married to Arwa.

Al-Mansur's first wife was Arwa, known as Umm Musa, whose lineage went back to the kings of Himyar. She had two sons, Muhammad (the future caliph al-Mahdi) and Ja'far. According to their pre-marital agreement, while Arwa was still alive, al-Mansur had no right to take other wives and have concubines in the Abbasid harem. Al-Mansur tried to annul this agreement several times, but Arwa always managed to convince the judges to not accede to the caliph's attempts. Arwa died in 764. After her death, al-Mansur married Hammadah and Fatimah.

Fatimah became the third wife of al-Mansur. Her father was Muhammad, a descendant of a prominent companion of the Islamic prophet Muhammad, Talhah ibn Ubaydallah. She had three sons, Sulayman, Isa, and Ya'qub.

Fatimah lived most of her life in the caliphal palace. She became the most influential wife of al-Mansur after Arwa. Her sons were not in the line of succession as al-Mansur kept his eldest sons as heirs. However, Fatimah's sons became important officials of the Caliphate.

== Family ==
Fatimah was related to the several members of the Abbasid ruling house of the Caliphate.

No.	Family member	Relation
1	Al-Mansur	Husband
2	Al-Mahdi	Step-son
3	Sulayman	Elder son
4	Isa ibn al-Mansur	Son
5	Ya'qub ibn al-Mansur	Youngest son
6	Ja'far ibn al-Mansur	Step-son
7	Salih al-Miskin	Step-son
8	Qasim ibn al-Mansur	Step-son
9	Aliyah bint al-Mansur	Step-daughter
10	Abbasa bint Sulayman	Granddaughter
11	Ja'far ibn Abi Ja'far	Step-son

== Sources ==
- Abbott, Nabia (1946). Two Queens of Baghdad: Mother and Wife of Hārūn Al Rashīd. University of Chicago Press. pp. 15–16
- Madelung, Wilferd (2000). "Abūʾl ʿAmayṭar the Sufyānī". Jerusalem Studies in Arabic and Islam. 24: 327–343.
- Kennedy, Hugh, ed. (1990). The History of al-Ṭabarī, Volume XXIX: Al-Mansūr and al-Mahdī, A.D. 763–786/A.H. 146–169. SUNY Series in Near Eastern Studies. Albany, New York: State University of New York Press. ISBN 978-0-7914-0142-2.
- Al-Tabari; Hugh Kennedy (1990). The History of al-Tabari Vol. 29: Al-Mansur and al-Mahdi A.D. 763-786/A.H. 146–169. SUNY series in Near Eastern Studies. State University of New York Press. pp. 148–49.
