= Sa'id ibn Abd al-Malik =

Son of Umayyad caliph Abd al-Malik ibn Marwan (died 750)

Sa'id ibn Abd al-Malik سعيد بن عبد الملك

Governor of Mosul
- In office 705–715
- Succeeded by: Yahya ibn Yahya al-Ghassani

Governor of Palestine
- Preceded by: Nadr ibn Yarim al-Himyari
- Succeeded by: Yazid ibn Sulayman ibn Abd al-Malik

Personal details
- Died: 750 Near Nahr Abi Futrus, Palestine, Abbasid Caliphate
- Parents: Abd al-Malik ibn Marwan (father); unnamed slave concubine (mother)
- Relatives: Al-Walid I (brother); Yazid II (brother); Muhammad (brother); Hisham (brother)

Military service
- Allegiance: Umayyad Caliphate
- Branch/service: Umayyad army
- Battles/wars: Arab–Byzantine wars; Umayyad invasions of Asia Minor

Sa'id ibn Abd al-Malik ibn Marwan (Arabic: سعيد بن عبد الملك بن مروان, romanized: Saʿīd ibn ʿAbd al-Malik ibn Marwān; died 750), also known as Saʿīd al-Khayr ('Sa'id the Good'), was an Umayyad prince and governor.

He played a role in the construction of the Dome of the Rock in Jerusalem in the early part of his father Caliph Abd al-Malik's reign (r. 685–705). He governed Mosul for an undetermined period under his father and was responsible for several building and infrastructural works there. Sa'id was later granted property in Mosul's vicinity by his brother, Caliph al-Walid I (r. 705–715), or his cousin, Caliph Umar ibn Abd al-Aziz (r. 717–720), which he developed into an agricultural tract with a canal. In 724 and 725, he led summer campaigns against the Byzantines in Anatolia. During the rule of his nephew, Caliph al-Walid II, between February 743 to April 744, Sa'id served as the governor of Palestine, but was expelled by rebels in the district after al-Walid II's death. Sa'id was killed in the massacre of the Umayyad family near Ramla after the Abbasid toppling of the dynasty in 750.

== Origins ==
Sa'id was the son of the Umayyad caliph Abd al-Malik (r. 685–705) and one of his concubines. He became known as Sa'id al-Khayr, which translates as 'Sa'id the Good', because of his piety, pleasantness and charitable works. The 9th-century historian al-Tabari notes that he was "man of good character", while the historian al-Baladhuri claimed he practiced asceticism. Between 688 and 692, Sa'id was the supervisory representative of his father for the construction of the Dome of the Rock in Jerusalem.

== Governor of Mosul ==
Sa'id was appointed governor of Mosul by Abd al-Malik, who conquered Iraq from the Umayyads' opponents, the Zubayrids, in 691. Others who served as governor of Mosul at some point during Abd al-Malik's reign were Sa'id's uncle Muhammad ibn Marwan and cousin Yusuf, the son of Yahya ibn al-Hakam. (Note: Information about the Umayyad governors of Mosul is scant and inconsistent in the early Islamic sources for the period between 680 and 726. Although the historian al-Azdi mentions Sa'id ibn Abd al-Malik, Muhammad ibn Marwan and Yusuf ibn Yahya ibn al-Hakam as governors during Abd al-Malik's rule, he does not provide the sequence or years of their respective terms in office.) Sa'id was responsible for a number of building works in the city during his rule. The 8th-century historian al-Waqidi attributes to him the construction of city walls, but these were later torn down by the Abbasid caliph Harun al-Rashid in 796. Sa'id is further credited in medieval Muslim sources for constructing a mosque, a monastery, a market, and the pavement of Mosul's streets.

Al-Baladhuri asserts that Caliph al-Walid I (r. 705–715) or Caliph Umar ibn Abd al-Aziz (r. 717–720) granted property in the Diyar Mudar district, in the vicinity of Mosul, to Sa'id as an iqta (land grant). He had a canal dug through the property, which was later named Nahr Sa'id after him. Through his irrigation and infrastructural works, he transformed his iqta from a lion-infested swamp into an agriculturally-productive area. Umar recalled Sa'id to Syria and replaced him with Yahya ibn Yahya al-Ghassani.

== Campaigns against the Byzantines ==
Under caliphs Yazid II (r. 720–724) and Hisham (r. 724–743), Sa'id led a number of summer campaigns against the Byzantines in Anatolia. He commanded the left flank of the Umayyad army during the summer expedition of 724, but his forces incurred heavy losses. Yazid II was said to have considered Sa'id as a suitable chosen successor to the caliphate and may have encouraged Sa'id to entertain such notions. In 725, Sa'id again led the summer campaign against the Byzantines.

== Governor of Palestine ==
During the relatively short caliphate of al-Walid II (r. 743–744), Sa'id was appointed governor of Palestine. He was known to have governed the district well. According to al-Tabari, when al-Walid II was killed in 744, the Arab tribes of Palestine, led by Sa'id ibn Rawh, a chieftain of the Banu Judham and son of Rawh ibn Zinba, opted for their local Umayyad patron, Yazid ibn Sulayman ibn Abd al-Malik, to be their governor. To that end, they demanded that Sa'id, who was encamped in Beersheba or in the vicinity of Bayt Jibrin, vacate the governorship. Sa'id obliged and sought safety with al-Walid II's successor, Yazid III, in Damascus. The latter subsequently sent an expedition against the rebels in Palestine. Sa'id's governorship lasted fourteen months, between February 743 and April 744.

In excavations carried out by an Israeli archaeological team in Beit Shean in 1990, a broken bronze weight produced on the orders of Sa'id was unearthed. The weight was most likely produced in Ramla or Jerusalem. In addition to the Muslim statement of belief, the surviving portion of the rare weight bore an inscription in Kufic Arabic that read: "Ordered by the Amir Sa'id ibn Abd al-Malik at the hands of ...".

== Death and descendants ==
Along with other princes descended from Abd al-Malik, including Sa'id's brothers Bakkar and Muhammad, Sa'id gave the oaths of allegiance to Caliph Marwan II (r. 744–750), a nephew of Abd al-Malik, at Dayr Ayyub in 744. Sa'id was killed alongside dozens of other Umayyads in a massacre by the Abbasids at the Abu Futrus river near Ramla in the wake of the Abbasids' toppling of the Umayyads in 750.

Following the Abbasid takeover of Syria, Sa'id's grandsons, the brothers al-Asbagh ibn Muhammad, Hisham ibn Muhammad, and al-Walid ibn Muhammad, established themselves with other Umayyads in al-Andalus, where the Umayyad prince Abd al-Rahman I established the Emirate of Cordoba. Al-Asbagh married a sister of Abd al-Rahman I and their descendants held high-ranking positions as qadis (judges) and commanders. The family of Hisham was based in Seville. Al-Walid's family, the Banu A'isha, also held high ranks in the Emirate.

Family tree of Sa'id ibn Abd al-Malik

Al-Hakam
Yahya | Marwan I (r. 684–685)
Yusuf | Abd al-Malik (r. 685–705) | Abd al-Aziz | Muhammad
Al-Walid I (r. 705–715) | Sulayman (r. 715–717) | Sa'id | Yazid II (r. 720–724) | Hisham (r. 724–743) | Umar II (r. 717–720) | Marwan II (r. 744–750)
Yazid III (r. 744–744) | Muhammad | Al-Walid II (r. 743–744) | Mu'awiya
Al-Asbagh | Hisham | Al-Walid | Abd al-Rahman I (r. 756–788)
Banu A'isha

Sa'id ibn Abd al-Malik
Umayyad caliphs
Umayyad emirs of Cordoba

== Bibliography ==
- Bosworth, C. E. (1972). "Rajāʾ ibn Haywa al-Kindī and the Umayyad Caliphs". The Islamic Quarterly. 16: 36–84.
- Hitti, Philip Khuri (1916). The Origins of the Islamic State: Being a Translation from the Arabic Accompanied With Annotations, Geographic and Historic Notes of the Kitab Futuh al-buldan. New York: Columbia University. p. 280.
- Blankinship, Khalid Yahya (1994). The End of the Jihâd State: The Reign of Hishām ibn ʻAbd al-Malik and the Collapse of the Umayyads. Albany, New York: State University of New York Press. ISBN 978-0-7914-1827-7.
- Gil, Moshe (1997) [1983]. A History of Palestine, 634–1099. Translated by Ethel Broido. Cambridge: Cambridge University Press. ISBN 0-521-59984-9.
- Hillenbrand, Carole, ed. (1989). The History of al-Ṭabarī, Volume XXVI: The Waning of the Umayyad Caliphate: Prelude to Revolution, A.D. 738–744/A.H. 121–126. SUNY Series in Near Eastern Studies. Albany, New York: State University of New York Press. ISBN 978-0-88706-810-2.
- Hinds, Martin, ed. (1990). The History of al-Ṭabarī, Volume XXIII: The Zenith of the Marwānid House: The Last Years of ʿAbd al-Malik and the Caliphate of al-Walīd, A.D. 700–715/A.H. 81–95. SUNY Series in Near Eastern Studies. Albany, New York: State University of New York Press. ISBN 978-0-88706-721-1.
- Kennedy, Hugh N. (2006). The Byzantine and Early Islamic Near East. Ashgate Variorum. ISBN 0-7546-5909-7.
- Kennedy, Hugh (2016) [1986]. The Prophet and the Age of the Caliphates: The Islamic Near East from the 6th to the 11th Century (Third ed.). Abingdon, Oxon and New York: Routledge. ISBN 978-1-138-78761-2.
- Khamis, Elias (July 2002). "A Bronze Weight of Saʿîd b. ʿAbd al-Malik from Bet Shean/Baysân". Journal of the Royal Asiatic Society. 12 (2): 143–154. JSTOR 25188250.
- Robinson, Chase F. (2004). Empire and Elites after the Muslim Conquest: The Transformation of Northern Mesopotamia. Cambridge University Press. ISBN 0-511-03072-X.
- Sábada, Elías Terés (1957). "Linajes árabes en al-Andalus". Al-Andalus (in Spanish). 22 (1): 55–112. ISSN 0304-4335.
- Williams, John Alden, ed. (1985). The History of al-Ṭabarī, Volume XXVII: The ʿAbbāsid Revolution, A.D. 743–750/A.H. 126–132. SUNY Series in Near Eastern Studies. Albany, New York: State University of New York Press. ISBN 978-0-87395-884-4.
