= Marwan ibn Abd al-Malik =

Umayyad prince, son of Caliph Abd al-Malik ibn Marwan (died c.715/7)

Marwan ibn Abd al-Malik مروان بن عبد الملك
- Died: 716 or 717; Umayyad Caliphate
Names
- Marwan ibn Abd al-Malik ibn Marwan
- Dynasty: Umayyad
- Father: Abd al-Malik
- Mother: Wallada bint al-Abbas ibn al-Jaz al-Absiyya
- Religion: Islam

Marwān ibn ʿAbd al-Malik ibn Marwān (Arabic: مروان بن عبد الملك بن مروان) (d. 715/16 or 716/17), referred to as Marwān al-Akbar (Arabic: مروان الأكبر, lit. 'Marwan the Elder') to distinguish him from his younger half-brother with the same name, was an Umayyad prince, son of Caliph Abd al-Malik ibn Marwan, (r. 685–705) and one-time heir to the caliphate.

== Life ==
Marwan was a son of the Umayyad caliph Abd al-Malik ibn Marwan and his first wife Wallada bint al-Abbas ibn al-Jaz, a member of the Banu Abs tribe and fourth-generation descendant of Zuhayr ibn Jadhima. Marwan was a full brother of the caliphs al-Walid I (r. 705–715) and Sulayman (r. 715–717). According to the 10th-century historian al-Tabari, Abd al-Malik instructed his immediate chosen successors al-Walid and Sulayman to invest the succession after them to their half-brother Yazid II (son of Atika bint Yazid) and then to Marwan al-Akbar. According to al-Baladhuri, however, it was to be passed to Marwan al-Asghar (another son of Atika). Marwan al-Akbar died on his return to Syria from the Hajj in Mecca in 715/16 or 716/17. He left no children. After his death, Caliph Sulayman maneuvered to remove Yazid II from the succession and install his own son Ayyub, but the latter predeceased Sulayman.

== Bibliography ==
- Bosworth, C. E. (1982). Medieval Arabic Culture and Administration. Variorum Reprints. ISBN 0-86078-113-5.
- Hinds, Martin, ed. (1990). The History of al-Ṭabarī, Volume XXIII: The Zenith of the Marwānid House: The Last Years of ʿAbd al-Malik and the Caliphate of al-Walīd, A.D. 700–715/A.H. 81–95. SUNY Series in Near Eastern Studies. Albany, New York: State University of New York Press. ISBN 978-0-88706-721-1.
- Powers, David S., ed. (1989). The History of al-Ṭabarī, Volume XXIV: The Empire in Transition: The Caliphates of Sulaymān, ʿUmar, and Yazīd, A.D. 715–724/A.H. 96–105. SUNY Series in Near Eastern Studies. Albany, New York: State University of New York Press. ISBN 978-0-7914-0072-2.
