= Bakkar ibn Abd al-Malik =

8th-century Umayyad prince

Bakkār ibn ʿAbd al-Malik بكار بن عبد الملك
- Born: Umayyad Caliphate
- Died: 750; Near Nahr Abi Futrus, Palestine, Umayyad Caliphate
- Spouse: Izza bint Abd al-Aziz ibn Abdallah ibn Amr ibn Uthman ibn Affan
Names
- Abū Bakr Bakkār ibn ʿAbd al-Malik ibn Marwān
- Dynasty: Umayyad
- Father: Abd al-Malik
- Mother: A'isha bint Musa ibn Talha ibn Ubaydallah
- Religion: Islam

Abū Bakr Bakkār ibn ʿAbd al-Malik ibn Marwān (died 750) was an Umayyad prince, a son of caliph Abd al-Malik (r. 685–705).

== Life ==
Bakkar, also known as Abu Bakr, was the son of the Umayyad caliph Abd al-Malik (r. 685–705) and his wife A'isha bint Musa, a granddaughter of Talha, a prominent companion of Muhammad. Bakkar was married to a former wife of his half-brother Caliph al-Walid I (r. 705–715), Izza bint Abd al-Aziz ibn Abdallah ibn Amr, a great-great-granddaughter of Caliph Uthman (r. 644–656). Bakkar and his half-brothers Sa'id al-Khayr and Muhammad were among those of the Umayyad family gathered by their cousin, Caliph Marwan II (r. 744–750), at Dayr Ayyub to give oaths of allegiance to Marwan's sons Ubaydallah and Abdallah as heirs apparent. He was among the Umayyads who were executed by the Abbasids at Nahr Abi Futrus in 750, after the dynasty was toppled.

== Bibliography ==
- Ahmed, Asad Q. (2011). The Religious Elite of the Early Islamic Ḥijāz: Five Prosopographical Case Studies. Oxford: University of Oxford Linacre College Unit for Prosopographical Research. ISBN 978-1-900934-13-8.
- Caskel, Werner (1966). Ğamharat an-nasab: Das genealogische Werk des His̆ām ibn Muḥammad al-Kalbī, Volume II (in German). Leiden: Brill. OCLC 490272940.
- Madelung, Wilferd (1997). The Succession to Muhammad: A Study of the Early Caliphate. Cambridge: Cambridge University Press. ISBN 0-521-56181-7.
- Williams, John Alden, ed. (1985). The History of al-Ṭabarī, Volume XXVII: The ʿAbbāsid Revolution, A.D. 743–750/A.H. 126–132. SUNY Series in Near Eastern Studies. Albany, New York: State University of New York Press. ISBN 978-0-87395-884-4.
