= Atika bint Yazid =

Umayyad princess and caliph Abd al-Malik's wife

Atika bint Yazid عاتكة بنت يزيد
- Born: Damascus, Umayyad Caliphate
- Died: Damascus, Umayyad Caliphate
- Burial: Damascus
- Spouse: Abd al-Malik ibn Marwan
- Issue: Yazid; Marwan al-Asghar; Mu'awiya; Umm Kulthum
- Dynasty: Umayyad
- Father: Yazid I
- Religion: Islam

Atika bint Yazid (Arabic: عاتكة بنت يزيد, romanized: ʿĀtika bint Yazīd) was an Umayyad princess. She was the daughter of Yazid I, and wife of Abd al-Malik ibn Marwan.

== Life ==
Atika was the daughter of second Umayyad caliph Yazid. She was the sister of third Umayyad caliph Mu'awiya II. Before Yazid I died, he had the bay'ah made to his son. Mu'awiya II succeeded his father in Damascus in 64 AH (November 683 CE), at an age of somewhere between 17. Her brother died in 684 and he was succeeded by succeeded by her Father-in-law Marwan, he ruled for one year and died in 685. Marwan was succeeded by her husband Abd al-Malik as the fifth Umayyad caliph. She was the influential wife of Abd al-Malik, her elder son was nominated heir of the Caliphate.

By dint of his descent, her son Yazid was a natural candidate for the succession to the caliphate. A noble Arab maternal lineage held political weight during this period in the Caliphate's history, and Yazid took pride in his maternal Sufyanid descent, viewing himself superior to his Marwanid brothers. He was chosen by his paternal half-brother Caliph Sulayman (r. 715–717) as the second-in-line for the caliphate after their first cousin Umar II, who ruled from 717 to 720. Yazid acceded at the age of 29 following the death of Umar II on 9 February 720. Yazid II's pedigree united his father's Marwanid branch of the Umayyad dynasty, in power since 684, and the Sufyanid branch of Yazid I and the latter's father Mu'awiya I (r. 661–680), founder of the Umayyad Caliphate.

Atika and Abd al-Malik had sons; Yazid II, Marwan al-Asghar, Mu'awiya and a daughter, Umm Kulthum. from their marriage. However, Atika was known as she was a relative to twelve Umayyad caliphs out of fourteen. (Note: The other two were Umar II, and Marwan II, nephews of her husband)

== See also ==
- Umm al-Banin bint Abd al-Aziz
- Fatima bint Abd al-Malik

== Bibliography ==
- Ahmed, Asad Q. (2011). The Religious Elite of the Early Islamic Ḥijāz: Five Prosopographical Case Studies. Oxford: University of Oxford Linacre College Unit for Prosopographical Research. ISBN 978-1-900934-13-8.
- Hinds, Martin, ed. (1990). The History of al-Ṭabarī, Volume XXIII: The Zenith of the Marwānid House: The Last Years of ʿAbd al-Malik and the Caliphate of al-Walīd, A.D. 700–715/A.H. 81–95. SUNY Series in Near Eastern Studies. Albany, New York: State University of New York Press. ISBN 978-0-88706-721-1.
- Lammens, H. & Blankinship, Kh. Y. (2002). "Yazīd (II) b. ʿAbd al-Malik". In Bearman, P. J.; Bianquis, Th.; Bosworth, C. E.; van Donzel, E. & Heinrichs, W. P. (eds.). The Encyclopaedia of Islam, Second Edition. Volume XI: W–Z. Leiden: E. J. Brill. p. 311. ISBN 978-90-04-12756-2.
- Wellhausen, Julius (1927). The Arab Kingdom and Its Fall. Translated by Margaret Graham Weir. Calcutta: University of Calcutta.
- Powers, David S., ed. (1989). The History of al-Ṭabarī, Volume XXIV: The Empire in Transition: The Caliphates of Sulaymān, ʿUmar, and Yazīd, A.D. 715–724/A.H. 96–105. SUNY Series in Near Eastern Studies. Albany, New York: State University of New York Press. ISBN 978-0-7914-0072-2.
