= Muhammad ibn Abd al-Malik ibn Marwan =

Umayyad prince and provincial governor (died 750)

Muhammad ibn Abd al-Malik محمد بن عبد الملك

Umayyad governor of the Hejaz
- In office 747/48–748/49
- Monarch: Marwan II (r. 744–750)
- Preceded by: Abd al-Wahid ibn Sulayman ibn Abd al-Malik
- Succeeded by: Al-Walid ibn Urwa al-Sa'di

Umayyad governor of Egypt
- In office 6 March – 2 May 724
- Monarch: Hisham (r. 724–743)
- Preceded by: Hanzala ibn Safwan al-Kalbi
- Succeeded by: Al-Hurr ibn Yusuf

Personal details
- Died: 750 Near Nahr Abi Futrus, Palestine, Abbasid Caliphate
- Relations: Umayyad dynasty
- Parent: Abd al-Malik ibn Marwan (father)

Muhammad ibn Abd al-Malik ibn Marwan (Arabic: محمد بن عبد الملك بن مروان, romanized: Muḥammad ibn ʿAbd al-Malik ibn Marwān; died 750) was an Umayyad prince, the son of Caliph Abd al-Malik (r. 685–705), who served as governor of Egypt under his half-brother Caliph Hisham (r. 724–743), but resigned shortly afterward. He later played a role in the intra-dynastic politics of the Umayyad Caliphate, including the Third Fitna and the succession of Caliph Marwan II (r. 744–750). He served as Marwan II's governor of Mecca, Medina and Ta'if in 747/48 and was executed by the Abbasids in the massacre of the Umayyads at Nahr Abi Futrus in Palestine in 750.

== Early life and career ==
Muhammad was a son of the Umayyad caliph Abd al-Malik and one of his slave women (umm walad). According to the historian Shiv Rai Chowdhry, Muhammad and his brother al-Hajjaj were named by Abd al-Malik because their names "were the most dear" to the caliph's staunchly loyal governor of Iraq al-Hajjaj ibn Yusuf (d. 714). Muhammad lived in Tiberias, the capital of Jund al-Urdunn (the military district of Jordan, e.g. modern-day northwestern Jordan, northern Israel and southern Lebanon). He had an estate at Raysun, also located in Jund al-Urdunn, which may have been granted to him by his half-brother Caliph Hisham ibn Abd al-Malik (r. 724–743). The latter had appointed Muhammad as his first governor of Egypt on 6 March 724. He resigned over a policy difference with the caliph and was replaced by another Umayyad, al-Hurr ibn Yusuf, on 2 May 724.

== Role in Third Fitna ==
Muhammad played a role in the Third Fitna, which came about following the assassination of his nephew, Caliph al-Walid II, in 744 and the subsequent accession of the leader of al-Walid's opponents within the Umayyad family, Muhammad's other nephew Yazid III. When news of al-Walid II's slaying reached the troops of Jund Filastin (the military district of Palestine) they deposed al-Walid II's governor, Muhammad's brother Sa'id al-Khayr, and proclaimed as their caliph Yazid ibn Sulayman, the son of Muhammad's and Sa'id's brother Caliph Sulayman (r. 715–717). Afterward, the troops of Jund al-Urdunn, led by the grandsons of Hubaysh ibn Dulja from the Banu al-Qayn tribe, joined the rebellion against Yazid III and appointed Muhammad as their leader. Yazid III dispatched Muhammad's nephew Sulayman ibn Hisham against the rebels. According to one account, Muhammad was persuaded by Yazid III's envoys to give the caliph his allegiance. Another account holds that the caliph's troops made forays into the villages of Jund al-Urdunn and raided Tiberias, where Muhammad's residence was plundered and his weapons, horses and camels seized, after which the troops of Jund al-Urdunn offered Yazid III their allegiance in nearby Sinnabra. Afterward, Yazid III appointed his brother Ibrahim ibn al-Walid the governor of Jund al-Urdunn. A third account holds that after Yazid III appointed Ibrahim governor, the troops of Jund al-Urdunn refused to recognize him, upholding their support for Muhammad, until they were offered financial incentives to decamp.

== Later life and death ==
Yazid III died later in 744 and Ibrahim acceded as caliph for a few months before abdicating to his distant cousin Marwan II. In 745 Muhammad, along with his brothers Sa'id al-Khayr and Abu Bakr Bakkar and the families of his nephews, the sons of caliphs al-Walid I (r. 705–715), Sulayman, Yazid II (r. 720–724) and Hisham, gave his allegiance to Marwan II at Deir Ayyub in the Hauran.

In 747/48, Marwan II appointed Muhammad the governor of Mecca, Medina and Ta'if in the Hejaz (western Arabia). He led the Hajj pilgrimage in Mecca in August 748. He was replaced as governor the following year with al-Walid ibn Urwa al-Sa'di. In the aftermath of the Abbasid revolution, which toppled the Umayyad Caliphate in 750, Muhammad was among the dozens of Umayyads who were executed by the Abbasids at a banquet at the Antipatris river (Nahr Abi Futrus) in Palestine.

== Bibliography ==
- Abbott, Nabia (1965). "A New Papyrus and a Review of the Administration of ʿUbaid Allāh b. al-Ḥabḥāb". In Makdisi, George (ed.). Arabic and Islamic Studies in Honor of Hamilton A. R. Gibb. Leiden: E. J. Brill. pp. 21–35.
- Biesterfeldt, Hinrich; Günther, Sebastian (2018). The Works of Ibn Wāḍiḥ al-Yaʿqūbī (Volume 3): An English Translation. Leiden: Brill. ISBN 978-90-04-35621-4.
- Blankinship, Khalid Yahya (1994). The End of the Jihâd State: The Reign of Hishām ibn ʻAbd al-Malik and the Collapse of the Umayyads. Albany, New York: State University of New York Press. ISBN 978-0-7914-1827-7.
- Chowdhry, Shiv Rai (1972). Al-Ḥajjāj ibn Yūsuf (An Examination of His Works and Personality) (Thesis). University of Delhi.
- Hillenbrand, Carole, ed. (1989). The History of al-Ṭabarī, Volume XXVI: The Waning of the Umayyad Caliphate: Prelude to Revolution, A.D. 738–744/A.H. 121–126. SUNY Series in Near Eastern Studies. Albany, New York: State University of New York Press. ISBN 978-0-88706-810-2.
- Hinds, Martin, ed. (1990). The History of al-Ṭabarī, Volume XXIII: The Zenith of the Marwānid House: The Last Years of ʿAbd al-Malik and the Caliphate of al-Walīd, A.D. 700–715/A.H. 81–95. SUNY Series in Near Eastern Studies. Albany, New York: State University of New York Press. ISBN 978-0-88706-721-1.
- Humphreys, R. Stephen, ed. (1990). The History of al-Ṭabarī, Volume XV: The Crisis of the Early Caliphate: The Reign of ʿUthmān, A.D. 644–656/A.H. 24–35. SUNY Series in Near Eastern Studies. Albany, New York: State University of New York Press. ISBN 978-0-7914-0154-5.
- Soucek, Priscilla P. (1993). "Solomon's Throne / Solomon's Bath: Model or Metaphor?". Ars Orientalis. 23: 109–134.
- Williams, John Alden, ed. (1985). The History of al-Ṭabarī, Volume XXVII: The ʿAbbāsid Revolution, A.D. 743–750/A.H. 126–132. SUNY Series in Near Eastern Studies. Albany, New York: State University of New York Press. ISBN 978-0-87395-884-4.
