= Yahya ibn Yahya al-Ghassani =

Yahya ibn Yahya ibn Qays al-Ghassani (Arabic: يحيى بن يحيى الغساني, romanized: Yaḥyā ibn Yaḥyā ibn Qays al-Ghassānī; 684–750s) was the Umayyad governor of Mosul during the reign of Caliph Umar II (r. 717–720), a transmitter of hadiths (traditions and sayings attributed to the Islamic prophet Muhammad) in Damascus, where he spent the majority of his life. He was a member of an elite family of the Ghassanids in Damascus and his descendants were also hadith transmitters in Damascus as late as the 9th century.

== Life ==
Yahya was born in 684. He was the son of Yahya ibn Qays ibn Haritha ibn Amr (d. 684), the head of the shurta (security forces) of the Umayyad caliph Marwan I (r. 684–685). They were members of the Ghassanid tribe, which, during the 6th century, served as federates of the Byzantine Empire in Syria and adopted Christianity. During the Muslim conquest of Syria many Ghassanids under the chieftain Jabala ibn al-Ayham fled the region with the retreating Byzantine armies, but a significant number remained and became part of Syria's military, political and scholarly elite and embraced Islam during the governorship and caliphate of Mu'awiya ibn Abi Sufyan (640s–680). Yahya's family was noted as an "honorable household" by the Damascene historian Ibn Asakir (d. 1176).

Caliph Umar II appointed Yahya governor of Mosul and its dependent districts and he remained in the post until the caliph's death in 720. Afterward, Yahya returned to Damascus where he devoted his life to scholarship, particularly as a transmitter of hadith, and as an expert of Islamic law and Arabic language and rhetoric. He was called sayyid ahl Dimashq (master of the Damascenes) by the historians Ibn Asakir, Abu Zur'a (d. 878) and Ibn Hajar al-Asqalani (d. 1449). Caliph Hisham (r. 724–743) considered Yahya for the post of qadi (head Islamic judge) of Damascus, but chose Yazid ibn Abi Malik instead.

Yahya died in 749/50, 750/51 or 752/53, depending on the source.

== Descendants ==
Although Yahya was the most well-known member of his family, several others were also recorded as transmitters of hadiths. His paternal uncle Sulayman ibn Qays transmitted hadiths of Muhammad via the latter's companions, including Abu Darda (d. 652). Yahya's son Hisham, grandsons al-Walid and Ibrahim, great-grandsons Ma'n (d. 835) and Ahmad and great-great-grandson Haritha, the last of whom was also the builder of a bathhouse in Jerusalem, all transmitted hadiths and formed part of the Damascene scholarly elite.

== Transmitter ==
One of the narratives originated by Yahya was the discovery of relics of John the Baptist during the construction of the Umayyad Mosque in Damascus ordered by Caliph al-Walid I (r. 705–715). Another narrative was the lamentation of the Abbasid caliph al-Mahdi, during his visits to Damascus and Jerusalem, that the Umayyads had surpassed the Abbasids in respect to their mosque in Damascus, the Dome of the Rock in Jerusalem, the caliph Umar II and their clients (mawali).

== Bibliography ==
- Forand, Paul G. (January–March 1969). "The Governors of Mosul According to al-Azdī's Ta'rīkh al-Mawṣil". Journal of the American Oriental Society. 89 (1): 88–105. doi:10.2307/598281. JSTOR 598281.
- Khalek, Nancy (2011). Damascus after the Muslim Conquest: Text and Image in Early Islam. New York: Oxford University Press. ISBN 978-0-19-973651-5.
