= Coin weights =

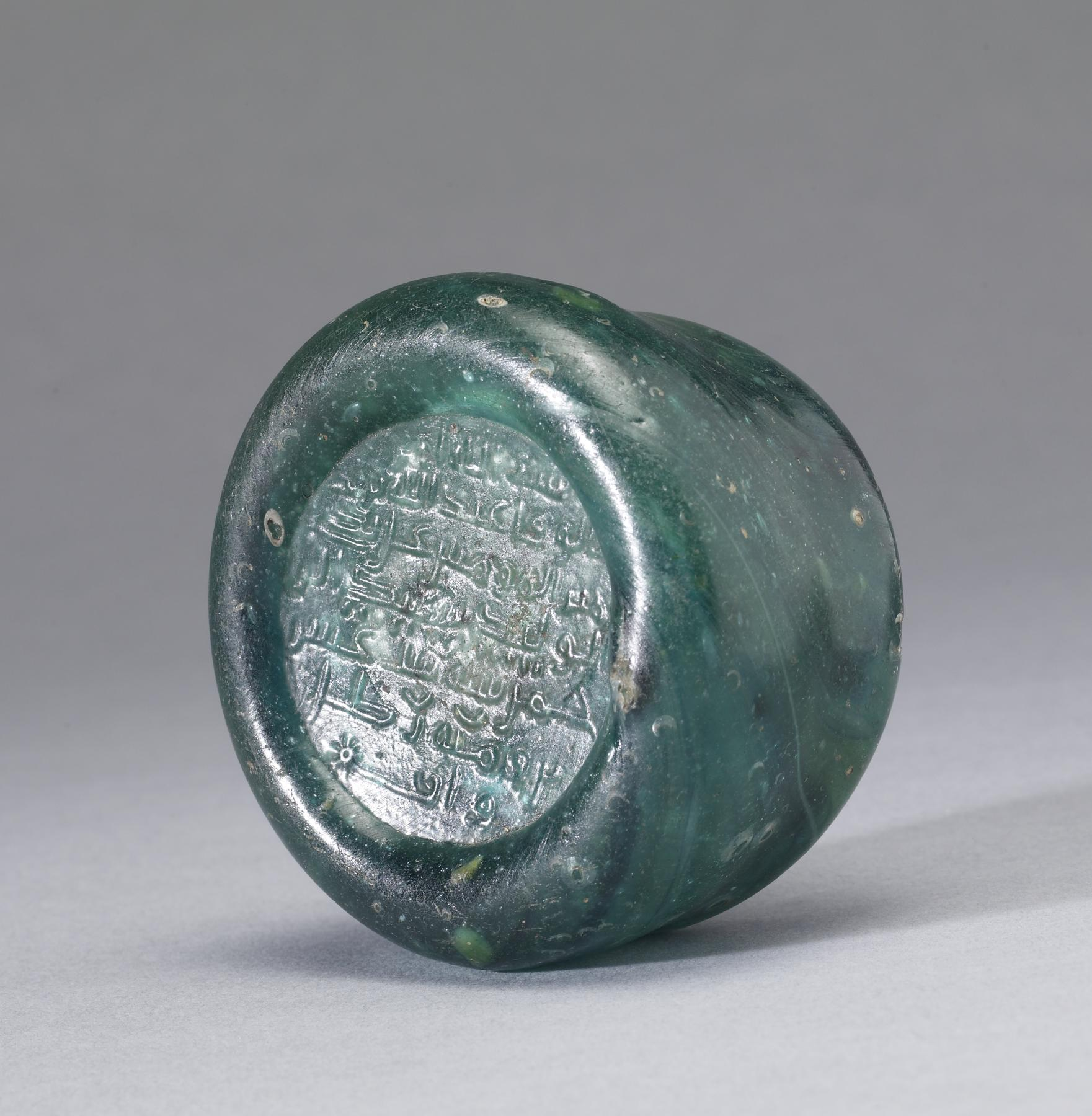
An inscribed Islamic pound weight from 743. Made of glass, it is one of the oldest earliest Islamic dated objects in an American museum. In the collection of the Walters Art Museum

Coin weights are weights used to weigh precious-metal coins in order to assure they were not underweight (It is easy to shave a bit of metal off the edge of a silver or gold coin).

== Overview ==
The usage of coin weights, especially glass ones, goes back to Ptolemaic and Byzantine times. Coin weights were also known in Ancient China.

In Islamic civilization, they are called Sanadjāt. Up to that point coins were only compared to coins of good quality. Islamic coin weights were made of bronze, iron, and later glass (considered to be unalterable). They bear inscriptions related to Islamic rulers and moneyers and are therefore valuable epigraphical objects.

Coins weights were also known in the Carolingian Empire, where they were stamped with regular coin dyes to clarify their attribution. Islamic coin weights were introduced to Great Britain in the 9-10th century CE through the Vikings.
