= Fatima bint Abd al-Malik =

Wife of Umayyad caliph Umar ibn Abd al-Aziz

Fatima bint Abd al-Malik فاطمة بنت عبد الملك
- Spouse: Umar ibn Abd al-Aziz
Names
- Fatima bint Abd al-Malik ibn Marwan
- Dynasty: Umayyad
- Father: Abd al-Malik
- Mother: Umm al-Mughira bint al-Mughira
- Religion: Islam

Fatima bint Abd al-Malik ibn Marwan (Arabic: فَاطِمَة بِنْت عَبْد الْمَلِك ٱبْن مَرْوَان, romanized: Fāṭima bint ʿAbd al-Malik ibn Marwān) was an Umayyad princess, daughter of Caliph Abd al-Malik ibn Marwan and a wife of Caliph Umar ibn Abd al-Aziz (r. 717–720).

== Life ==
Fatima was the daughter of Abd al-Malik ibn Marwan from his second wife from the Banu Makhzum, Umm al-Mughira bint al-Mughira ibn Khalid, a great-granddaughter of the pre-Islamic leader of the Quraysh, Hisham ibn al-Mughira. From this marriage, Abd al-Malik had his daughter Fatima, who was wedded to Umar II.

Following the death of Umar's father Abd al-Aziz, her father Abd al-Malik recalled Umar to Damascus, where he arranged Umar's marriage to his daughter, Fatima.

== Sources ==
- Hinds, Martin, ed. (1990). The History of al-Ṭabarī, Volume XXIII: The Zenith of the Marwānid House: The Last Years of ʿAbd al-Malik and the Caliphate of al-Walīd, A.D. 700–715/A.H. 81–95. SUNY Series in Near Eastern Studies. Albany, New York: State University of New York Press. ISBN 978-0-88706-721-1.
- Hinds, M. (1991). "Makhzum". In Bosworth, C. E.; van Donzel, E. & Pellat, Ch. (eds.). The Encyclopaedia of Islam, Second Edition. Volume VI: Mahk–Mid. Leiden: E. J. Brill. pp. 137–140. ISBN 978-90-04-08112-3.
- Cobb, P. M. (2000). "ʿUmar (II) b. ʿAbd al-ʿAzīz". In Bearman, P. J.; Bianquis, Th.; Bosworth, C. E.; van Donzel, E. & Heinrichs, W. P. (eds.). The Encyclopaedia of Islam, Second Edition. Volume X: T–U. Leiden: E. J. Brill. pp. 821–822. doi:10.1163/1573-3912_islam_COM_1282. ISBN 978-90-04-11211-7.
- Wellhausen, Julius (1927). The Arab Kingdom and Its Fall. Translated by Margaret Graham Weir. Calcutta: University of Calcutta.
