= Mansur ibn Jumhur al-Kalbi =

8th-century Arab commander and provincial governor

Mansur ibn Jumhur al-Kalbi (Arabic: منصور بن جمهور الكلبي) was an 8th-century Arab commander and one of the main and most fanatical leaders of the south Arab ("Yaman") tribes in the Qays–Yaman rivalry of the period, playing a major role during the Third Fitna civil war.

Patricia Crone describes Mansur as "a coarse soldier equally devoid of nobility and piety" who was "shunned by devout contemporaries" as he disregarded religion and was motivated solely by his desire to avenge the torture and murder of the Yaman champion, Khalid al-Qasri, by the ardently pro-Qays governor of Iraq, Yusuf ibn Umar al-Thaqafi, in 743.

A member of the Amir branch of the Banu Kalb tribe, he began his career possibly in Iraq, where the tribe had settled, but appears for the first time in Syria as a member of the plot to overthrow Caliph al-Walid II in early 744. After Walid's murder, his successor Yazid III favoured the Yaman faction, and appointed Mansur as governor of Iraq in succession to Yusuf al-Thaqafi, perhaps as a deputy of al-Harith ibn al-Abbas ibn al-Walid. His tenure was brief, as he was soon replaced by the son of Caliph Umar II, Abdallah ibn Umar ibn Abd al-Aziz. During his governorship, Mansur tried to dismiss the governor of Khurasan, Nasr ibn Sayyar, nominating his own brother Manzur as replacement, but Nasr managed to hold out and maintain his post until Mansur's replacement.

Mansur returned to Syria, but soon returned to Iraq, where he fought against the Kharijite rebels under al-Dahhak ibn Qays al-Shaybani. As the Kharijites proved successful, he embraced their doctrine and converted to save his life. He continued fighting alongside the Kharijites until Marwan II's general Yazid ibn Hubayra defeated them in 747. Like many opponents of Marwan, he fled to Fars and joined the forces of the Alid rebel Abdallah ibn Mu'awiya. When Ibn Hubayra defeated Ibn Mu'awiya shortly after, Mansur fled to India, where he managed to become governor of Sind, and even obtained recognition of this post from the nascent Abbasid Caliphate. In 751, however, Mansur fled to the desert, where he died.

== Sources ==
- Crone, Patricia (1980). Slaves on Horses: The Evolution of the Islamic Polity (1980 ed.). Cambridge: Cambridge University Press. ISBN 978-0521229616.
- Hawting, Gerald R. (2000). The First Dynasty of Islam: The Umayyad Caliphate AD 661–750 (Second ed.). London and New York: Routledge. ISBN 0-415-24072-7.

| Preceded by Yusuf ibn Umar al-Thaqafi | Governor of Iraq; 744 | Succeeded by Abdallah ibn Umar ibn Abd al-Aziz |
| Unknown Title last held by Amr ibn Muhammad al-Thaqafi | Governor of Sind ca. 747–751 | Succeeded by Musa ibn Ka'b al-Tamimi |
