= Juday al-Kirmani =

8th-century Azdi commander in Khurasan

- جديع الكرماني
- Died: 747; Merv
- Years active: 736–747
- Known for: General of the Umayyad Caliphate; interim governor of Khurasan (738); leader of a Yaman uprising in 744–747

Juday ibn Ali al-Kirmani al-Ma'ni (Arabic: جديع بن علي الكرماني المعني; fl. 736–747) was an Arab commander in Khurasan during the final decades of the Umayyad Caliphate. He initially helped defeat the rebel al-Harith ibn Surayj and his Türgesh allies in 736–737, becoming one of the most prominent men in Khurasan and a rival to the Umayyad governor, Nasr ibn Sayyar. The rivalry led in 744 to a revolt of the Yamani tribes against Nasr, in which al-Kirmani was joined by his former enemy, Ibn Surayj. The two allies expelled Nasr from the provincial capital, Merv, in late 746 but soon fell out, and both Ibn Surayj and later al-Kirmani were killed. The turmoil of the revolt opened the way for the start and eventual triumph of the Abbasid Revolution.

== Biography ==
=== Early career ===
Map of Khurasan and Transoxiana in the 8th century

As his nisba shows, Juday al-Kirmani was born and raised at Jiruft in Kirman. His family belonged to the Azd 'Uman, and was closely allied to the Muhallabid clan, which was prominent in the Islamic East; Juday's father had fought under al-Muhallab ibn Abi Sufra in Kirman.

Juday first appears in 736, during the suppression of the revolt of al-Harith ibn Surayj by the governor of Khurasan, Asad ibn Abdallah al-Qasri. With a contingent of 6,000 men, al-Kirmani blockaded the fortress of Tabushkhan, in Upper Tokharistan, where many of Ibn Surayj's supporters, including some of his relatives and his army's baggage train, had taken refuge. After the fortress surrendered, according to the 10th-century historian al-Tabari, 400 of the men were executed, and the other defenders, including women and children, were sold into slavery at Balkh. Defeated, Ibn Surayj and the remnants of his followers fled across the Oxus River and found refuge with the Türgesh Khaganate. In the next year, the Türgesh heavily defeated an Arab army across the Oxus, and in turn invaded Khurasan, joined by Ibn Surayj and his men. During the subsequent campaign, Juday was named Asad's deputy and left in charge of the defence of Balkh, which at the time was Khurasan's capital and the main base for the Arab military operations against the Türgesh. The Türgesh invasion was turned back at the Battle of Kharistan in December 737, where the Türgesh khagan was routed and in turn forced to flee across the Oxus, accompanied by Ibn Surayj. The widely dispersed Türgesh detachments sent to raid south of the Oxus were largely destroyed piecemeal by al-Kirmani, ending the threat to Khurasan.

His successes under Asad rendered al-Kirmani the most prominent man in Khurasan, according to the judgment of his contemporaries. Al-Tabari reports that when Asad died in 738, Juday was appointed governor of Khurasan by the governor of Iraq, Yusuf ibn Umar al-Thaqafi. However, Caliph Hisham ibn Abd al-Malik (r. 724–743) distrusted the Yaman (southern Arab tribes), to whom al-Kirmani's own Azd tribe belonged; and with the exception of Asad himself, since the downfall of the Muhallabids in 717, Khurasan had been ruled by governors from the northern Arab tribes (Qays or Mudar), who favoured their own kin and humiliated the southerners. Junayd was thus not confirmed in office, but replaced by Nasr ibn Sayyar, a veteran soldier from Khurasan whose own tribe was fairly unimportant, and thus deprived him of any independent power base. As a result, Nasr's rule throughout his tenure was not fully accepted by many Arab tribesmen and especially the Yaman, who still favoured al-Kirmani; Nasr's position was thus heavily reliant on firm backing from the Umayyad imperial government in Damascus.

=== Revolt ===
That support was undermined during the civil war of the Third Fitna, during which the Qays–Yaman rivalry broke out into open fighting; the eventual victor, Marwan II, was a champion of the northern Arab Qays. During the civil war, the security of Nasr's position fluctuated depending on the regime ruling in Damascus. Under the brief reign of the pro-Yaman Yazid III in 744, the Yaman in Khurasan hoped to see al-Kirmani appointed governor. Agitation among the Yaman persisted, amidst rumours that Nasr had intercepted letters appointing al-Kirmani as governor, and a dispute on the payment of stipends to the Khurasani Arab militia (muqatila). Nasr tried to secure his own position by deposing al-Kirmani from his leadership of the Azd, as well as by trying to win over Azd and Rabi'ah leaders. All this resulted in an uprising by the Azd and Rabi'ah under al-Kirmani, with the slogan "revenge for the Muhallabids", whose downfall at the hands of the Umayyads had become a symbol of Yamani resentment of the Umayyads and their northern Arab-dominated regime.

On 13 July 744, al-Kirmani was captured and imprisoned by Nasr, but he managed to escape after barely a month. The rebellion spread, with many of the Arab settlers around Merv joining it; although collectively called Yamaniyya in the sources, al-Kirmani's followers included most of the Syrian troops in the province as well as many northern Arab Mudar. A tentative truce was initially agreed upon, during which fruitless negotiations were conducted, but after Yazid reconfirmed Nasr in his post, al-Kirmani resumed his revolt. Nasr in turn tried to strengthen his own position by enlisting the services of al-Harith ibn Surayj, al-Kirmani's one-time adversary, who enjoyed considerable support among some Arab tribes and especially his own tribe, the northern Arab Tamim. When Ibn Surayj arrived at Merv in July 745, he was enthusiastically received by the town's inhabitants, scorned Nasr's proposals for cooperation, and soon rose in rebellion as well. In March 746 Ibn Surayj's army attacked Marv, but was repulsed with many casualties, and he then made common cause with al-Kirmani—of whose activities between his escape in 744 and this point nothing is known. With Marwan II still trying to consolidate his own position in Syria and Mesopotamia, Nasr was bereft of any hopes of reinforcement, and the allied armies of Ibn Surayj and al-Kirmani drove him out of Merv towards the end of 746.

Nasr retreated to Nishapur, but within days al-Kirmani and Ibn Surayj fell out among themselves and clashed, resulting in the death of Ibn Surayj. Al-Kirmani then destroyed the Tamimi quarters in Merv. This was a shocking act, as dwellings were traditionally considered exempt from warfare in Arab culture. As a result, the Mudari tribes, who hitherto had withheld their support from Nasr, now came over to him. With their backing, Nasr resolved to take back the capital. Nasr's and al-Kirmani's armies confronted each other before the walls of Marv, occupying two fortified camps and skirmishing with each other during June–September 747. The fighting stopped only when news came of the uprising of the Hashimiyya under Abu Muslim, which posed a threat to both. Negotiations commenced, but were almost broken off when a member of Nasr's entourage, an embittered son of Ibn Surayj, attacked and killed al-Kirmani.

Al-Tabari claims that Nasr crucified al-Kirmani's body with a fish beside it, in a ritual humiliation of the Azd 'Uman, who originally were fishermen; but this tradition is considered unlikely by modern historians, as al-Kirmani's son and successor, Ali, quickly came to an agreement with Nasr. Nevertheless, both men remained wary of each other, and separately tried to win the backing of Abu Muslim, who now held the balance of power. The latter eventually chose to support al-Kirmani. On 14 February 748, the Hashimiyya army occupied Mwrv, and Nasr again had to flee the city. While the Hashimiyya forces were launched west in pursuit of Nasr, the fragile alliance between the Yaman under Ali al-Kirmani and Abu Muslim remained in place, and Ali's brother Uthman was even named governor of Balkh. After the defeat and death of Nasr in late 748, Abu Muslim felt himself strong enough to have both brothers and their most prominent followers killed. By the end of 750, the Hashimiyya forces had completed the Abbasid Revolution, overthrowing the Umayyad Caliphate and physically eliminating most of the Umayyad dynasty; in their place, the Abbasid Caliphate was established.

== Sources ==
- Blankinship, Khalid Yahya, ed. (1989). The History of al-Ṭabarī, Volume XXV: The End of Expansion: The Caliphate of Hishām, A.D. 724–738/A.H. 105–120. SUNY Series in Near Eastern Studies. Albany, New York: State University of New York Press. ISBN 978-0-88706-569-9.
- Gibb, H. A. R. (1923). The Arab Conquests in Central Asia. London: The Royal Asiatic Society. OCLC 499987512.
- Hawting, Gerald R. (2000). The First Dynasty of Islam: The Umayyad Caliphate AD 661–750 (Second ed.). London and New York: Routledge. ISBN 0-415-24072-7.
- Shaban, M. A. (1979). The ʿAbbāsid Revolution. Cambridge: Cambridge University Press. ISBN 0-521-29534-3.
- Sharon, Moshe (1990). Revolt: The Social and Military Aspects of the ʿAbbāsid revolution. Jerusalem: Graph Press Ltd. ISBN 965-223-388-9.
- Williams, John Alden, ed. (1985). The History of al-Ṭabarī, Volume XXVII: The ʿAbbāsid Revolution, A.D. 743–750/A.H. 126–132. SUNY Series in Near Eastern Studies. Albany, New York: State University of New York Press. ISBN 978-0-87395-884-4.
