= Qays–Yaman rivalry =

Tribal rivalry in the Middle East

The Qays–Yaman rivalry refers to the rivalry between the tribal factions of Qays–Mudar and the Yaman. The history of the rivalry centers mainly within the armies and administrations of the Umayyad Caliphate in the 7th and 8th centuries, but persisted to varying degrees among the Arabs through Ottoman rule (1517–1918). Membership in either faction was rooted in the genealogical origins of the tribes, real or perceived, which divided them into south Arabian descendants of Qahtan (the Yaman) or north Arabian descendants of Adnan (Qays–Mudar).

The tribes which constituted the Yaman, most prominently the Kalb, Ghassanids, Tanukh and Judham, were well-established throughout the Syria (the Levant) since the pre-Islamic period, while the Qaysi tribes, namely the Sulaym, Banu Amir and Ghatafan migrated to northern Syria and Upper Mesopotamia with the Muslim armies in the 7th century. The feud did not effectively take shape until after the reign of Caliph Mu'awiya I (r. 661–680), who, along with his Sufyanid descendants, were tied to the Kalb, the leading tribe of Yaman, through marriage and military dependence. When the last Sufyanid caliph died in 684, the Kalb and its allies resolved to ensure continued Umayyad rule to maintain their stately privileges, while the Qays backed Abd Allah ibn al-Zubayr's bid for the caliphate. That year, the Kalb routed the Qays at the Battle of Marj Rahit, leading to years of revenge-driven, tit-for-tat raids known as ayyam (days) because the battles were typically day-long affairs.

By 693, the raids had largely subsided as the Qays reconciled with the Umayyads under Caliph Abd al-Malik and were incorporated into the state. The Umayyads thereafter attempted to balance the powers and privileges of both factions, but the rivalry smoldered until the Third Muslim Civil War, in which the Yaman assassinated Caliph al-Walid II (r. 743–744) for his dependence on the Qays. Yamani opposition continued under Caliph Marwan II (r. 744–750), and they defected to the Abbasids as the latter conquered the Umayyad realm in 750. The Yaman and Qays briefly joined forces against the Abbasids later that year, but were defeated. The Qays–Yaman rivalry diminished significantly under the Abbasids who, unlike the Umayyads, did not derive the bulk of their military support from either faction. Nonetheless, the feud persisted at the local level to varying degrees in the following centuries, which saw occasional outbreaks of Qaysi–Yamani violence.

During the Ottoman period, the rivalry resurged in Mount Lebanon and Palestine, and affiliation with either faction transcended ethnicity and religion and was made by families with little consideration to genuine tribal lineage. In Mount Lebanon, the feud was mostly fought out between different Druze clans until the Battle of Ain Dara in 1711 led to the near complete exodus of Yamani Druze. Across Palestine, the rivalry encompassed Bedouin tribesmen, peasant clans and townspeople. Most actual fighting took place in Nablus and its hinterland and the area around Jerusalem. The feud gradually dissipated with the growth of Ottoman centralization in the mid-19th century.

== Origins ==
=== Genealogical differences ===
The origins of the Qays–Yaman division were traditionally based on an Arab tribe's northern or southern Arabian roots, real or perceived; the Qays were from northern Arabia, while the Yaman were from southern Arabia. Genealogically, the northern tribes were traditionally said to descend from Ishmael while the southern tribes were said to descend from Qahtan. Historical Arab sources sometimes referred to the southern Arabs as Qahtāniyya (Qahtanites), but more often called them ahl al-Yaman (lit. 'the people of Yemen') or al-Yamāniyya (lit. 'Yemenites'). Northern Arabs were seldom referred to as 'Ishmaelites', possibly because that became a general term for all Arabs. Specifically, the northerners were described as Adnanites after Adnan, a descendant of Ishmael, or called after Adnan's descendant Nizar (Nizāriyya). Most commonly, the northerners were called after Nizar's son Mudar (Muḍariyya) or one of Mudar's descendant, Qays (Qaysiyya). Not all the northern Arabs were labeled under 'Mudar' or 'Qays'; the Rabi`ah, another branch of the Nizar whose traditional homeland was eastern Arabia, vacillated in alliance between Qays/Mudar and Yaman, and historical sources often referred to them as a third party to the Qays–Yaman feud.

There is no mention of hostility between the two tribal groupings in pre-Islamic Arab tradition. The Qays did not function as a tribal confederation before the advent of Islam, and in ancient Arab histories, the tribes that formed the confederation were mentioned individually rather than as a collective. According to historian W. Montgomery Watt, it was during the Umayyad period (661–750) that the Arab tribes organized themselves along northern (Qaysi) and southern (Yamani) lines "so as to constitute something like a political party". The rivalry between Yaman and Qays may have stemmed from competition over grazing rights in Syria following the conquest. However, open conflict between them occurred only during the Second Muslim Civil War (680–692).

=== Geographical distribution ===
Map of Syria in the 9th century. The Yaman tribes, including the Banu Kalb, Ghassan, Judham and Tanukh, largely inhabited the districts of Filastin, al-Urdunn and Hims, while the Qays inhabited al-Jazirah, the Byzantine frontier and Qinnasrin

During the Umayyad and Abbasid eras, one of the bases of the Qays–Yaman division was geographical. Syria was divided into five military-administrative districts (ajnad; sing. jund): Filastin centered around Ramla; al-Urdunn centered around Tiberias; Dimashq centered around Damascus; Hims centered around Hims; and Qinnasrin centered around Chalcis.

Traditionally, it is held that the Yamani tribes inhabited the southern ajnad of Syria, namely Filastin and al-Urdunn, "but the reality was more complex", according to historian Paul M. Cobb. Al-Urdunn was dominated by the Yaman, particularly the Ash'ar tribe, but Filastin was an abode for Yamani and Qaysi tribes, (Note: Historian Moshe Gil compiled a list of Qays and Yaman tribes that inhabited Filastin and al-Urdunn during the early Muslim period. Among the Yaman tribes in Filastin were the Judham, Lakhm, Ghassan, Madh'hij, Azd, Quda'a and its Juhaynah sub-clan, Khuza'a, Himyar and its Sayban sub-clan, Kindah, Zubayd, Khath'am and Khawlan. The Yaman tribes in al-Urdunn were the Amila and the Ash'ar. The Qays tribes in Filastin included Ghatafan and its Murrah sub-clan, Kilab, Uqayl, Tamim, Thaqif, Taghlib and Hudhayl. The Qays tribe in al-Urdunn was the Sulaym.) who viewed the district as particularly profitable. By the end of the Umayyad era, however, Yaman apparently was the predominant faction in Filastin. The tribes of Dimashq, which included the regions of Ghutah, Hawran and Transjordan and was even more profitable than Filastin, were predominantly Yamani, though a significant Qaysi minority existed. The Yaman also dominated Hims, including the Palmyrene steppe, while the Qays dominated Qinnasrin, along with Upper Mesopotamia (known by Arabs as al-Jazirah) and the Byzantine frontier as far as Armenia.

Some of the Yamani tribes, including the Kalb, Tanukh, and Judham, had settled in Syria prior to the 7th-century Muslim conquest. Well-established in their regions, many of the Yamani tribes formed alliances with the Byzantine Empire, which controlled the region prior to the Muslim conquest, and embraced Christianity; some sections of certain Yamani tribes remained Christian following the Muslim conquest. Many of the Qays tribes, particularly the Kilab, Sulaym and Uqayl, were moved to Upper Mesopotamia from Arabia by the Umayyad caliph, Mu'awiya I (r. 661–680). At the same time, a number of Yamani tribes in Mu'awiya's army, such as the Kindah and the Hadhrami, joined other established Yamani tribes around Homs.

Meanwhile, the Qays/Mudar–Yaman conflict in Iraq, specifically Basra, was rooted in the mass migration of southern Azd tribesmen from Oman to Basra just prior to the Second Muslim Civil War. Before then, Basra was dominated by northern tribesmen from the Mudar faction, led by the Tamim tribe, and the Rabi'ah faction. The Azd became allies with Rabi'ah, despite the latter's northern roots. With this, the "parties had been formed for future conflict", according to historian G. R. Hawting. Moreover, because the Arab troops of Khurasan came from the Basra garrison, the Qays/Mudar–Yaman conflict carried over into that vast eastern province of the caliphate. The migration of Qaysi tribes to northern Syria and Upper Mesopotamia and of the Yamani Azd to Basra upset the tribal balance of power in these regions, which significantly influenced the Qays/Mudar–Yaman feud.

== Umayyad era ==
=== Battle of Marj Rahit ===
It is likely the Qays and Yaman factions firmly took shape after Mu'awiya I's reign; previously, differences between Qaysi and Yamani tribes were "fairly harmless", according to historian Hugh N. Kennedy. Mu'awiya's reliance on Kalb troops and his son Yazid's mother being Kalbi caused unease among Qays chieftains. Meanwhile, political disarray spread throughout the caliphate in the wake of Caliph Yazid's death in 683 and his successor Mu'awiya II several weeks later. There were no obvious successors among the ruling Sufyanid branch of the Umayyad dynasty, which the Kalb were determined to preserve so as to maintain the administrative and military privileges they acquired under them. Thus, the Kalb's chieftain, Hassan ibn Malik ibn Bahdal, assembled the representatives of the Yamani tribes of Syria for a shura (council) in Jabiyah wherein they chose an Umayyad outsider, Marwan (r. 684–685), to be the next caliph; Marwan made significant political concessions to the Kalb, which drove the Qays, led by the governor of Damascus, al-Dahhak ibn Qays al-Fihri, to back Abdullah ibn Zubayr's claim to the caliphate.

Marwan and the Kalb set up camp at Marj Rahit, overlooking al-Dahhak's Damascus headquarters, and were soon joined by the Yamani Ghassanids and Kindah. Other Yamani tribes that joined Marwan were the Tayy, al-Qayn and Tanukh. As the Qays under al-Dahhak marched toward Marwan's camp, a Ghassanid scion, Yazid ibn Abi al-Nims, led a revolt in Damascus that drove al-Dahhak's men out of the city. The two factions then fought at the Battle of Marj Rahit, which lasted twenty days, beginning on 18 August 684. The far more numerous Qays were routed and many of them were killed as they retreated, including al-Dahhak and eighty other Qaysi notables. The survivors among the Qays, led by Zufar ibn al-Harith al-Kilabi of 'Amir, fled north to the Euphrates town of al-Qarqisiyah, while Marwan was made caliph in Damascus.

The Battle of Marj Rahit firmly divided the Arab tribes of Syria into Yaman or Qays. According to Kennedy, the "Qays had many dead to avenge and the feud was to continue for generations", while Marwan "would be entirely dependent on the ... Yamani tribes who had elected him". Indeed, the Yaman helped Marwan assert his rule in Egypt and smoothly managed the accession of his son, Abd al-Malik (r. 685–705), following Marwan's death in 685. The Yamani leaders, Ibn Bahdal of Kalb and Rawh ibn Zinba of Judham, were Abd al-Malik's main supporters, other than his kinsmen. All the while, the Qays in Upper Mesopotamia and northern Syria under Zufar's leadership remained steadfastly behind Ibn Zubayr, and stymied the expansion of Umayyad authority to Zubayrid-held Iraq.

=== Ayyam raids ===
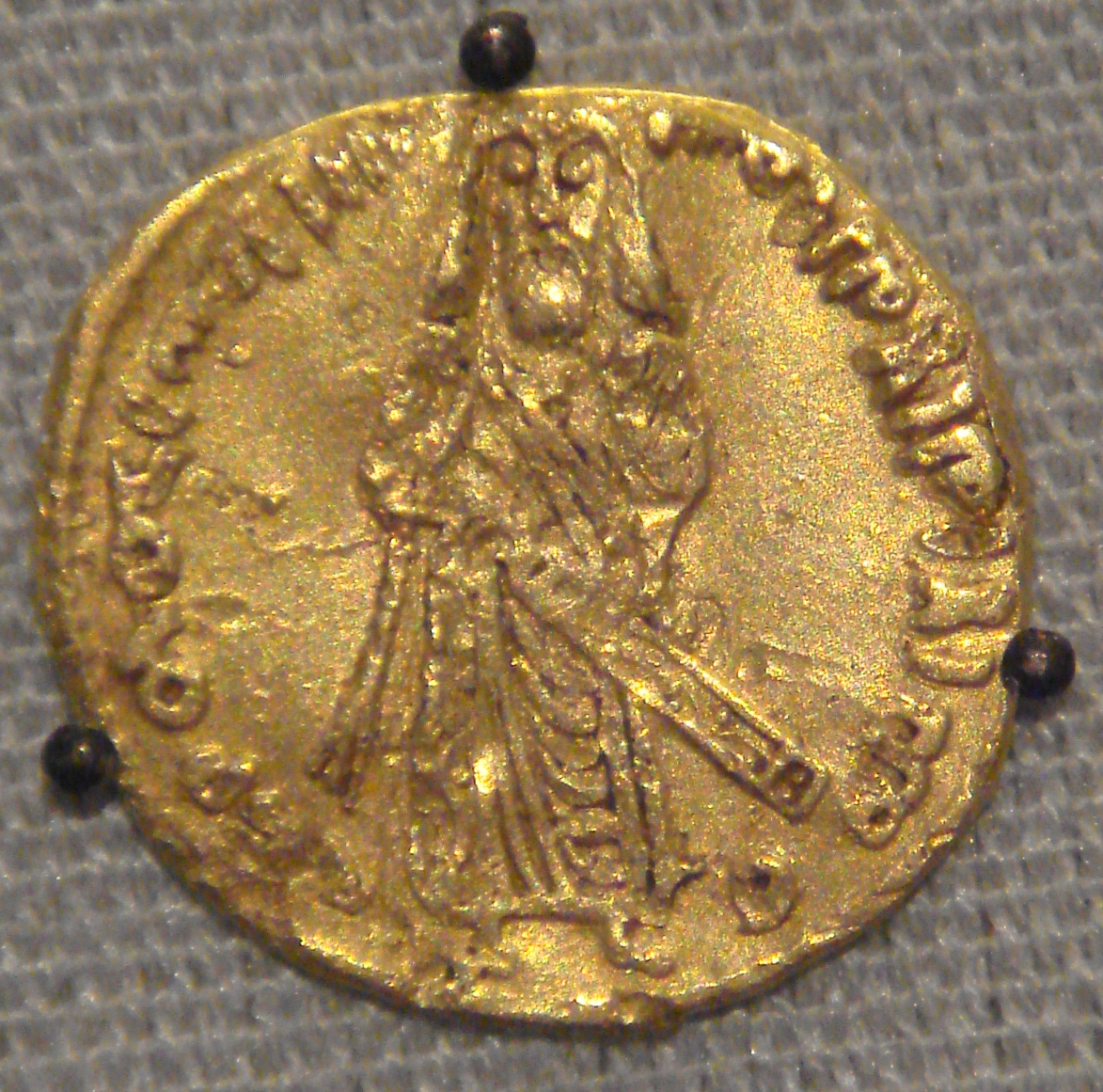
Caliph Abd al-Malik (685–705), depicted on this gold dinar issued by him, struggled to keep peace between the Qays and Yaman.

Following Marj Rahit, the Qays initiated a series of raids and counter-raids against the Yaman, particularly the latter's leading faction, the Kalb. Because each confrontation was typically a day-long, the raids were referred to by medieval Arab sources as ayyām (days; sing. yawm), with each yawm named after the place where the attack occurred. The sources of the ayyām battles were contemporary Arab poems and stories that were preserved in the Kitab al-Aghani, Kitab al-Hamasah and the histories of al-Mada'ini (d. ca. 843) and Ibn al-Athir (d. 1233). Historian Julius Wellhausen asserts that "the accounts are mostly quite reliable, though partly without connection and chronology". The cycle of raids began following the battlefield defection of the Qaysi general and Sulaym chieftain, Umayr ibn al-Hubab, from the Umayyad army during the Battle of Khazir against the pro-Alid forces of al-Mukhtar in 686. The defection of Umayr and his troops, who took refuge with Zufar in al-Qarqisiyah, was blamed for the rout of the Umayyad force.

Though the exact year is not available in contemporary sources, the first ayyām raid was carried out by Zufar against a Kalb encampment at Musaiyakh in the environs of Hims, in which twenty Kalb tribesmen were killed. The Kalb, led by Humayd ibn Hurayth ibn Bahdal, responded by killing sixty men from the Qaysi tribe of Numayr living among the Kalb in Palmyra. Afterward, Umayr led an assault on Iklil, in the vicinity of Palmyra, that killed between 500 and 1,000 Kalb tribesmen. Umayr evaded Humayd's pursuit and made it back to al-Qarqisiyah. Umayr followed up on his victory by leading several damaging raids against the Kalb in their dwelling places in the Samawah desert, including at a well named Kaaba, in which Humayd was nearly killed. The Kalb in Samawah ultimately fled for the Jordan Valley in Palestine as a result of the attacks.

Umayr later settled his Sulaym tribesmen along the Khabur River, where they encroached on the grazing lands of the Taghlib. The latter, a Christian tribe belonging to the Rabi'ah, had settlements stretching from the Khabur eastward beyond the Tigris River. The Taghlib requested Zufar's intervention to evict the Sulaym but Zufar was unable to mediate the dispute. Instead, Umayr received sanction from the Zubayrids to assault the Taghlib, and with a large force he massacred numerous Taghlib tribesmen at the Khabur village of Makisin. Further Qaysi-Taghlib skirmishes, which also dragged in Zufar on the side of Umayr, took place along the Khabur, Tigris, Balikh and Tharthar rivers. In 689, the Taghlib ambushed the Qays at the Tharthar village of al-Hashshak, near Tikrit. The ensuing battle lasted three days, and towards the end, Zufar and his 'Amir kinsmen retreated to al-Qarqisiyah and abandoned Umayr, who was ultimately killed by the Taghlib. The latter sent Umayr's head to Abd al-Malik.

Obliged to avenge the death of his Qaysi comrade, Zufar retaliated against the Taghlib, dealing them a heavy blow at the Tigris village of Kuhail. Afterward, he executed 200 captured Taghlib tribesmen. In 691, Abd al-Malik's siege of al-Qarqisiyah pushed Zufar to accept a negotiated surrender to Umayyad authority. Per the agreement, Abd al-Malik incorporated Qaysi tribesmen into the Umayyad court and army. The entry of Qays into the reconstituted Umayyad army of Syria ended Yamani, and specifically Kalbi, monopolization of that institution; from then on Abd al-Malik sought to balance each faction's interest within the military. Abd al-Malik's forces also defeated the Umayyads' Zubayrid rivals and patrons of the Qays, Mus'ab ibn al-Zubayr in Iraq in October 691 and Abdullah ibn al-Zubayr in Mecca in September 692. These developments put an end to Qaysi attacks against the Taghlib. Around this time, the Taghlib's celebrated poet and representative to the Umayyad court, al-Akhtal, recited a poem to Abd al-Malik boasting of the victory over Qays and their surrender to Abd al-Malik:

(Thanks to us) the men of Qays came forth hastening to pledge allegiance to you [Abd al-Malik] publicly after long denial.
May God never lead Qays back from their error; and may no one say 'Take care!' when they stumble ...
... They [Qays] lived in blessed abundance till they were caught in Satan's [Ibn Zubayr's] snares.
— Al-Akhtal, circa 691/92.

Despite Abd al-Malik's accord with the Qays, the two camps continued to attack each other. Thereafter, the battles spread to the Hejaz and Iraq, unlike most of the early confrontations, which occurred in Upper Mesopotamia and the Palmyrene steppe. Thus, the Qays–Yaman conflict broke out of its Syrian confines and into the wider Islamic world. Humayd still sought revenge for prior losses the Kalb suffered at the hands of the 'Amir and Sulaym, but since those two tribes were now under Abd al-Malik's protection, Humayd resolved to attack the Qaysi tribe of Fazara. The latter mainly lived east of Medina, but their ruling clan inhabited Kufa. They were not previously involved in attacks against the Yaman. Humayd acquired a warrant from the Umayyad prince, Khalid ibn Yazid, to collect the cattle tax from the Fazara on behalf of Abd al-Malik's government. Using this legal cover, Humayd led a large expeditionary force of Kalbi clans against Fazara tribesmen in Iraq, killing and wounding many, particularly at a place called 'Âh. The Fazara protested these assaults to Abd al-Malik, who responded by paying them blood money, which the Fazara, in turn, used to purchase weaponry and horses. In circa 692/93, the Fazara retaliated against the Kalb in a surprise attack against their encampment at the Banat Qain wells in the Samawah, which ended with the deaths of 69 Kalb tribesmen. The raid on Banat Qayn was the most celebrated of the ayyam between Qays and Kalb. Infuriated at the Fazara's attack, Abd al-Malik ordered his general al-Hajjaj ibn Yusuf to lead an expedition against the Fazara. However, the two main Fazara commanders from Banat Qain, Sa'id ibn Uyaynah and Halhalah ibn Qays, surrendered themselves to avert a military assault against their tribe. The Fazara commanders were then executed to satisfy the Kalb, who accepted it as a compensation for their losses.

=== Tribal balancing in the state ===
Abd al-Malik's ability to end Qaysi–Yamani violence was mostly limited to issuing threats or paying blood money. Though he succeeded in transforming the Umayyad Caliphate into a centralized, bureaucratic state with decreasing reliance on the Syrian army, Kennedy notes that the "Qays–Yaman feud illustrated the problems of transition" in the caliphate from nomadism to settled life and governance. After 691, each faction became associated with an Umayyad prince; the Qays allied themselves with Abd al-Malik's brother and governor of Upper Mesopotamia, Muhammad ibn Marwan, while the Yaman were associated with Abd al-Malik's Palestine-based son, Sulayman. These affiliations played an important role during future intra-Umayyad rivalry. After the accession of al-Walid I (r. 705–715), Qaysi–Yamani tensions simmered, but did not result in serious conflict. Al-Walid, whose mother Wallada was Qaysi, afforded the Qays a degree of privilege. Nonetheless, the Yaman held significant influence with other branches of the Umayyad household, namely with Sulayman, but also Umar ibn Abd al-Aziz, who maintained the ties his father established with Yamani army leaders in Egypt. Moreover, with the accession of Sulayman in 715, the Yamani general Raja ibn Haywa of Kindah became his chief adviser and the Yaman regained their advantageous position within the Umayyad state.

There is disagreement among historians over the basis of the Qays–Yaman conflict during and after Sulayman's reign. Medieval Arab sources describe the conflict mainly as a tribal rivalry. M. A. Shaban asserts that the Qays came to represent the policies of Islamic expansionism and Arab governmental monopolization embraced by Abd al-Malik and the powerful governor al-Hajjaj ibn Yusuf, while the Yaman supported stabilizing the caliphate's borders and assimilating non-Arabs into the state. The Yaman's allies and successive caliphs, Sulayman (r. 715–717) and Umar ibn Abd al-Aziz (717–720), pursued such policies. Kennedy argues against Shaban's theory, instead holding that the conflict "was between two factions based on tribal loyalties, which sought to control access to military power and the privileges that went with it". To that end, the ultimate goal for each faction was the caliph's favor and appointment to provincial governorships.

Qaysi–Yamani alignment among the Arab tribes was present throughout the Caliphate and avoiding association with either camp became increasingly difficult for Muslim leaders. In Iraq, the two major rival tribes, Azd and Tamim, became the central component of the Yaman and Qays, respectively, in that province. The Qays–Yaman rivalry also played out among constituent Arab tribes in the Umayyad army in Khurasan. Though Shaban characterized Umar ibn Abd al-Aziz as strongly pro-Yamani for his efforts to integrate non-Arab Muslim communities, the caliph evidently maintained a more balanced policy in regard to the rivalry and sought to end the tribal factionalism. His appointment of provincial governors was based on competence and loyalty to his authority. To that end, he appointed the Qaysi stalwart, Umar ibn Hubayra al-Fazari, as governor of Upper Mesopotamia and dismissed the Yamani governor of Iraq and Khurasan, Yazid ibn al-Muhallab of Azd, in favor of several governors, many of whom were not Yamani. Nonetheless, Umar ibn Abd al-Aziz's reforms threatened Qaysi interests and following his death in 720, the Qays helped restore the old order through his successor, Yazid II (r. 720–724).

During Yazid II's reign, Ibn al-Muhallab revolted in Iraq, capturing Wasit and Kufa. It is not apparent that he was supported by the Yamani tribes of Syria, and his revolt was crushed by a strong ally of the Qays, Maslama ibn Abd al-Malik. Umar ibn Hubayra's subsequent appointment to Iraq saw the violent purge of Yamani leaders in the province. Yazid died in 724 and his successor, Hisham (r. 724–743), managed to avoid entanglement with the Qays–Yaman rivalry, and appointed Khalid al-Qasri from the ostensibly neutral Bajila tribe as governor of Iraq. Hisham's reign was one of the most internally peaceful periods in the Umayyad Caliphate, and there were no violent incidents reported between the Qays and Yaman within the Umayyad army during that time. Toward the end of his reign and out of concern for maintaining stability in the aftermath of his death, Hisham increasingly relied on Qaysi support. To that end, in 738, he replaced al-Qasri, who had possible Yamani sympathies, with the staunch Qaysi, Yusuf ibn Umar of Thaqif, and appointed another Qaysi stalwart, Nasr ibn Sayyar, as governor of Khurasan.

=== Third Muslim Civil War ===
The Qays–Yaman feud persisted, but the caliphate remained stable and prosperous by the time of Hisham's death in 743. However, this situation unraveled as a result of the policies and incompetence of his successor, al-Walid II (r. 743–744). The latter left the state administration largely in the hands of Hisham's Qaysi appointees, and his arrest of the Yaman's patrons among the Umayyad family, rallied the Yaman against his rule. Walid II's governance was seen by members of the Umayyad family as so egregious that a section of them led by Yazid III decided to depose him, an unprecedented action in Umayyad dynastic history. Though much of the Umayyad family and other leaders were reluctant to back Yazid III, the Yamani tribes, partly led by the Kalbi chieftain Mansur ibn Jumhur, provided him critical support; the Yaman were motivated by a desire to reestablish their once dominant position in the state. The rebels captured Damascus, then besieged and killed Walid II in the vicinity of Palmyra in 744. Consequently, the Qays–Yaman conflict violently intensified. Kennedy asserts:

It would be wrong to imagine that all members of these two groups were implacably hostile; it would seem that the violence was begun by extremists like Yusuf ibn Umar for the Qaysis and Mansur ibn Jumhur for the Yamanis, but once it had begun, it was very difficult to stop and came to involve the whole Syrian army and political elite. It was this fatal division, more than anything else, which destroyed [the] Umayyad government.

Yazid III's reign lasted six months, during which he briefly appointed Ibn Jumhur governor of Khurasan. He was succeeded by his brother Ibrahim ibn al-Walid, but in December 744 the latter was overthrown by Marwan II (r. 744–750), a strongman favored by the Qays of Upper Mesopotamia and the Byzantine frontier zone. The Qays were the only part of the Syrian elite that backed Marwan II's usurpation, after which the leaders of Yaman were driven out of Syria. A rebellion in the Kalb stronghold of Homs ensued, but was suppressed by Marwan II in 746. Opposition to Marwan II sparked rebellions in the provinces east of Syria, with Ibn Jumhur throwing his lot with the Alid rebel Abd Allah ibn Mu'awiya.

Marwan II dispatched the Qaysi Yazid ibn Umar to suppress the Alid-Yamani revolt in Kufa. Ultimately, the Yaman of Syria and Iraq, and the Kharijites under al-Dahhak al-Shaybani, were defeated by Marwan II's forces and a respite in the war was achieved by the spring of 748. However, by December 748, the Abbasid Revolution in Khurasan was in earnest and its leader, Abu Muslim, drove out the Qaysi governor Nasr ibn Sayyar from Merv and advanced westward. Yazid ibn Umar dispatched the Qaysi generals Nubata ibn Hanzala of Kilab and 'Amir ibn Dubara of Murrah to halt Abu Muslim's march, but they were defeated by Qahtaba ibn Shabib of Tayy. Iraq, with the exception of Qaysi-held Wasit, was conquered by the Abbasids under as-Saffah (r. 750–754) in October 749. Qaysi troops rallied behind Marwan II as he advanced against the Abbasids, but he was decisively defeated at the Battle of Zab in February 750; Umayyad power all but diminished as a result. When the Abbasid army reached Damascus in pursuit of Marwan II, Yamani tribesmen facilitated their entry into the city.

== Post-Umayyad period ==
Though the Abbasid Revolution was "hotly pro-Yaman and anti-Qays", once the Abbasids consolidated power they "took up the tribal balancing policy of the defunct Umayyad regime", according to historian Khalid Yahya Blankinship. Much of the Qaysi leaders of Upper Mesopotamia and the Byzantine and Armenian frontiers, including Marwan's close ally, Ishaq ibn Muslim of Uqayl, eventually embraced the Abbasids. However, in the immediate aftermath of the Abbasid annexation of Syria in 750, the Qays of Qinnasrin led by Abu al-Ward and the Yaman of Hims and Palmyra led by the Umayyad nobleman Abu Muhammad al-Sufyani launched a revolt to reinstate Umayyad rule. However, the Qaysi–Yamani coalition was defeated relatively quickly by the Abbasids, with the Qays in particular suffering heavy casualties.

Following the collapse of the Umayyads and relocation of the caliphate's capital from Syria to Baghdad, the political significance of the Qays and Yaman factions diminished considerably. Watt asserts that "little is heard of the hostility" between Qays and Yaman following the advent of the Abbasids. Nonetheless, throughout the following centuries, Qaysi–Yamani alignment continued to serve as an "organizing principle for all sorts of feuds within or between tribes, clans, and neighborhoods, not just in Syria, but more generally throughout the Arab world", according to historian Robert Irwin. With time, the feud transcended nomadic Arab tribes and even Arabs in general; the Qays–Yaman division also existed among Kurds and Berbers.

Irwin asserts that in contrast to the scholarship devoted to the Qays–Yaman feud during the Umayyad era, the "importance of Qays and Yaman loyalties in the Mamluk period has been largely neglected" by historians. During the Mamluk period in Syria, nomadic Arab tribes (ʿurban or ʿarab), semi-nomadic Arab tribes (ʿushran or ʿasha'ir) and, to an extent, non-Arab tribes or groups often claimed belonging to either the Qays or Yaman factions. Historian William Popper wrote that the asha'ir, particularly the Druze, of the hills and valleys around Safad, Wadi al-Taym and Jabal Amil sometimes organized themselves along Qays and Kalb (Yaman) lines during the Mamluk period. During some occasions in which non-mamluks (those not part of the manumitted slave soldier tradition) partook in the internecine warfare between the Mamluk elite, they took up the Qaysi or Yamani label. For the most part, Qaysi–Yamani feuding does not appear to have played a role in the tribal strife of the early Mamluk period. The division became more pronounced, or at least recognized by Mamluk historians, during the closing decades of the 14th century. Even then, references to the factional feud were sporadic and do not establish the rivalry's continuity during the Mamluk era.

== Ottoman era ==
=== Damascus and environs ===
During the early Ottoman era, the inhabitants of Damascus divided themselves along Qays–Yamani lines, with the residents of Bab al-Jabiya, al-Shaghour, Salihiyya, Shaykh Raslan, Masjid Aqsab and Qubeibat affiliated with the Qays and the residents of al-Midan, Mazabil and Mahruqa belonging to the Yaman. In the environs of Damascus, the chiefs of Zabadani, Wadi al-Taym and the Marj area (south of the city), and the Harfush dynasty of Baalbek were all Yamani.

=== Mount Lebanon ===
In Mount Lebanon during Mamluk rule, the local Druze nobility was split along Qaysi–Yamani lines, with the Alam al-Din and Buhtur families representing Yaman and Qays, respectively. When the Ma'an family supplanted Buhtur in 1516, the Qaysi clans rallied around them. The Yaman under Alam al-Din temporarily prevailed against the Ma'an under Emir Qurqmaz, but the latter's son Fakhr ad-Din II, successfully reasserted Qaysi dominance in Mount Lebanon until his death in 1633. Afterward, a Yamani attempt to control Mount Lebanon led to a massacre and civil strife, but by 1635 and until the end of the 17th century, the Qays under Ma'an leadership remained dominant. The Sunni Muslim Shihab dynasty replaced their Ma'an kinsmen as the leaders of the Qaysi Druze after the Ma'an's chief died without progeny in 1697. In 1709, the Qays lost their position in Mount Lebanon at the hands of the Yaman, but the latter were dealt a decisive blow during the Battle of Ain Dara in 1711, in which numerous Yamani fighters and the entire leadership of the Alam al-Din family were killed. Afterward, the Yamani Druze, besides the Arslan clan, emigrated from Mount Lebanon, with most taking refuge in the Hawran. The Battle of Ain Dara essentially ended the Qays–Yaman feud in Mount Lebanon. From then on, feuding factions were known after their leading clans.

=== Palestine ===
Qays–Yaman affiliation in Palestine had an extensive history. However, many who adhered to either Qays and Yaman, including some of the factions' leading families, such as the Abu Ghosh, were not ethnic Arabs, but of Circassian, Kurdish or Turkmen stock. Meanwhile, families that did claim Arab origin chose allegiance with either Qays or Yaman without much consideration to their north or south Arabian lineage; sometimes, branches of the same clan adhered to different factions because of intra-family disputes. Bedouin tribes, peasant clans and townspeople all identified with one or the other faction, including families whose origins were not clear.

According to Marom, "In the eighteenth century, the hinterland of Nablus suffered from civil strife due to the Qays (northern Arabians) and Yaman (southern Arabians) rivalry. Most of society—including fellahin (the peasantry), Bedouins and ahl al-mudun (townsfolk) was affiliated with one of these factions. The strife disrupted rural life, precipitating emigration and village formation in areas that were less densely populated". Indeed, according to historian Ihsan al-Nimr, the northern section of Jabal Nablus was designated for the Yaman, while the southern part was given to Qays by Mamluk sultan an-Nasir Muhammad (r. 1293–1340, with interruption). During Ottoman rule throughout the 16th century, there were frequent clashes between families across Palestine based on Qays–Yaman divisions. Most of the fighting was concentrated in the hinterlands of Nablus and Jerusalem during the 18th and 19th centuries.

==== List of Qays–Yaman affiliations ====
As seen in sources from the 18th and 19th centuries by labor zionist Yitzchak Ben-Tzvi, the tribal division is shown in the following examples:

- The Zaydani tribe, to whom Galilee ruler Zahir al-Umar belonged, was part of the Qays tribe.
- The inhabitants of Bethlehem, both Muslim and Christian, belonged to Yaman and flew a white flag.
- The inhabitants of Hebron belonged to Qays, and flew a red flag.
- In Bayt Nattif and Sar'a, the Qays tribe ruled.
- The inhabitants of Abu Ghosh and Dura belonged to Yaman.
- The head tribe of Kafr Kanna was called Kais al Hamra (= Kais the red), according to Al-Dimashqi.
- Jerusalem was divided between the Husseini (Yaman), Nashashibi (Qays), and Khalidi (Qays) families.
- Nablus was divided between the Tuqan (Qays) and Abd al-Hadi (Yaman) families.
- The Ta'amreh tribe from the wilderness of Jerusalem and Hebron belonged to Yaman.

== Bibliography ==
- Bell, Richard (January 1903). "The Diwan des 'Umeir ibn Schujeim al-Qutami". The Journal of the Royal Asiatic Society of Great Britain and Ireland: 208–213. doi:10.1017/S0035869X00030136. S2CID 163261951.
- Blankinship, Khalid Yahya (1994). The End of the Jihâd State: The Reign of Hishām ibn ʻAbd al-Malik and the Collapse of the Umayyads. Albany, New York: State University of New York Press. ISBN 978-0-7914-1827-7.
- Crone, Patricia (1994). "Were the Qays and Yemen of the Umayyad Period Political Parties?" (PDF). Der Islam. 71: 1–57. doi:10.1515/islm.1994.71.1.1. S2CID 154370527. Archived from the original (PDF) on 2025-01-15.
- Dixon, A. A. (1978). "Kalb b. Wabara—Islamic Period". In van Donzel, E.; Lewis, B.; Pellat, Ch. & Bosworth, C. E. (eds.). The Encyclopaedia of Islam, Second Edition. Volume IV: Iran–Kha. Leiden: E. J. Brill. pp. 493–494. OCLC 758278456.
- Hawting, G. R., ed. (1989). The History of al-Ṭabarī, Volume XX: The Collapse of Sufyānid Authority and the Coming of the Marwānids: The Caliphates of Muʿāwiyah II and Marwān I and the Beginning of the Caliphate of ʿAbd al-Malik, A.D. 683–685/A.H. 64–66. SUNY Series in Near Eastern Studies. Albany, New York: State University of New York Press. ISBN 978-0-88706-855-3.
- Hawting, G. R. (2000). The First Dynasty of Islam: The Umayyad Caliphate AD 661-750 (Second ed.). New York: Routledge. ISBN 0-415-24072-7.
- Hoexter, Miriam (1972). "Qays and Yaman Factions in Local Political Divisions". Asian and African Studies. 2 (1). Jerusalem Academic Press.
- Irwin, Robert (2003). "Tribal Feuding and Mamluk Factions in Medieval Syria". In Robinson, Chase F. (ed.). Texts, Documents, and Artefacts: Islamic Studies in Honour of D. S. Richards. Leiden: Brill. ISBN 90-04-12864-6.
- Gil, Moshe (1997) [1983]. A History of Palestine, 634–1099. Translated by Ethel Broido. Cambridge: Cambridge University Press. ISBN 0-521-59984-9.
- Kennedy, Hugh N. (2004). The Prophet and the Age of the Caliphates: The Islamic Near East from the 6th to the 11th Century (Second ed.). Harlow: Pearson Education Limited. ISBN 0-582-40525-4.
- Le Strange, G. (1890). Palestine Under the Moslems: A Description of Syria and the Holy Land from A.D. 650 to 1500. London: Committee of the Palestine Exploration Fund.
- Marsham, Andrew (2009). Rituals of Islamic Monarchy: Accession and Succession in the First Muslim Empire. Edinburgh: Edinburgh University Press. ISBN 978-0-7486-2512-3.
- Rihan, Mohammad (2014). The Politics and Culture of an Umayyad Tribe: Conflict and Factionalism in the Early Islamic Period. London: I. B. Tauris and Company Limited. ISBN 9781780765648.
- Stetkevych, Suzanne Pinckney (2002). The Poetics of Islamic Legitimacy: Myth, Gender, and Ceremony in the Classical Arabic Ode. Bloomington: Indiana University Press. ISBN 0-253-34119-1.
- Watt, W. Montgomery (1978). "Kays ʿAylan". In van Donzel, E.; Lewis, B.; Pellat, Ch. & Bosworth, C. E. (eds.). The Encyclopaedia of Islam, Second Edition. Volume IV: Iran–Kha. Leiden: E. J. Brill. OCLC 758278456.
- Baer, Gabriel & Hoexter, Miriam (1978). "Kays and Yaman in the Ottoman Period". In van Donzel, E.; Lewis, B.; Pellat, Ch. & Bosworth, C. E. (eds.). The Encyclopaedia of Islam, Second Edition. Volume IV: Iran–Kha. Leiden: E. J. Brill. pp. 482–485. OCLC 758278456.
- Wellhausen, Julius (1927). The Arab Kingdom and its Fall. Translated by Margaret Graham Weir. Calcutta: University of Calcutta. OCLC 752790641.
