= Third Fitna =

744–750 civil war in the Umayyad Caliphate

- Part of the Fitnas and the Qays–Yaman rivalry
- The extent of the Umayyad Caliphate c. 740, before the Third Fitna
| Date | 744–750 |
| Location | Syria; Iraq; Persia; Arabia; Egypt |
| Result | Abbasid victory: Marwan II initially emerges victorious in the intra-Umayyad civil war; Kharijite and Ibadi revolts suppressed; End of the Umayyad Caliphate and establishment of the Abbasid Caliphate |

Belligerents
| Pro-Qays Umayyads | Pro-Yaman Umayyads | Anti-Umayyad factions; Alids; Ibadis; Kharijites; Hashimiyya |

Commanders and leaders
| Al-Walid II †; Marwan II; Majza'a ibn al-Kawthar; Yazid ibn Umar; Nasr ibn Sayyar; Hawthara ibn Suhayl | Yazid III # Ibrahim ibn al-Walid (surrendered); Sulayman ibn Hisham; Yazid ibn Khalid; Juday al-Kirmani X Abd Allah ibn Umar | Abd Allah ibn Mu'awiya (executed); Al-Dahhak ibn Qays †; Talib al-Haqq †; Abu Hamza al-Mukhtar †; Abu Muslim al-Khurasani |

The Third Fitna (Arabic: الفتنة الثاﻟﺜـة, romanized: al-Fitna al-thālitha), (Note: The word fitna (Arabic: فتنة, meaning trial or temptation) occurs in the Qur'an in the sense of test of faith of the believers, especially as a divine punishment for sinful behavior. Historically, it came to mean a civil war or rebellion which caused rifts in the unified Muslim community and endangered the believers' faith.) was a series of civil wars and uprisings against the Umayyad Caliphate. It began with a revolt against al-Walid II in 744, and lasted until 747, when Marwan II emerged as the victor. The war exacerbated internal tensions, especially the Qays–Yaman rivalry, and the temporary collapse of Umayyad authority opened the way for Pro-Alid, Kharijite and other anti-Umayyad revolts. The last and most successful of these was the Abbasid Revolution, which began in Khurasan in 747, and ended with the overthrow of the Umayyad Caliphate and the establishment of the Abbasid Caliphate in 750.

== Background ==
The civil war began in 744 with the overthrow of al-Walid II (r. 743–744) who had succeeded his uncle Hisham ibn Abd al-Malik (r. 724–743). Hisham had been appointed by his brother, Yazid II (r. 720–724), who had specified that his son, al-Walid II, should succeed him. Al-Walid II's accession was initially well received due to Hisham's unpopularity and his decision to increase army pay, but the mood quickly changed. Al-Walid II was reported to have been more interested in earthly pleasures than in religion, a reputation that may be confirmed by the decoration of the so-called "desert castles" (including Qusayr Amra and Khirbat al-Mafjar) that have been attributed to him. His accession was resented by some members of the Umayyad family itself, and this hostility deepened when he designated his two underage sons as his heirs and flogged and imprisoned his cousin, Sulayman ibn Hisham. Further opposition arose through his persecution of the Qadariyya sect, and through his involvement in the ever-present rivalry between the northern (Qaysi/Mudari) and southern (Kalbi/Yamani) tribes. Like his father, al-Walid II was seen as pro-Qays, especially after his appointment of Yusuf ibn Umar al-Thaqafi as governor of Iraq, who tortured his Yamani predecessor, Khalid al-Qasri, to death. However, adherence was not clear cut, and men from both sides of the divide joined the other.

=== Usurpation of Yazid III ===
In April 744, Yazid III, a son of al-Walid I (r. 705–715), entered Damascus. His supporters, bolstered by many Kalbis from the surrounding region, seized the town and proclaimed him caliph. Al-Walid II, who was at one of his desert castles, fled to al-Bakhra near Palmyra. He mustered a small force of local Kalbis and Qaysis from Hims, but when Yazid III's far larger army under Abd al-Aziz ibn al-Hajjaj ibn Abd al-Malik arrived, most of his supporters fled. Al-Walid II was killed, and his severed head was sent to Damascus. A pro-Qaysi uprising in Hims followed, under the Sufyanid Abu Muhammad al-Sufyani, but its march on Damascus was decisively defeated by Sulayman who had been released from prison. Abu Muhammad was thrown in prison in Damascus along with al-Walid II's sons.

During his brief reign, Yazid III was an exemplary ruler, modelling himself on the pious Umar II (r. 717–720). He was favourably disposed to the Qadariyya, and consciously tried to disassociate himself from the frequent criticism of autocratic rule leveled at his Umayyad predecessors. He promised to refrain from abuses of his power—mostly concerning widespread resentment at heavy taxation, the enrichment of the Umayyads and their adherents, the preference given to Syria over other parts of the Caliphate, and the long absence of soldiers on distant campaigns—and insisted that not only was he chosen by the community in an assembly (shūrā), rather than appointed, but that the community had the right to depose him if he failed in his duties or if they found someone more fit to lead them. At the same time, his reign saw the renewed ascendancy of the Yaman, with Yusuf ibn Umar dismissed and imprisoned after trying, without success, to raise the Qaysis of Iraq into revolt. Yusuf's successor in Iraq and the East was the Kalbi Mansur ibn Jumhur, but he was soon replaced by the son of Umar II, Abd Allah ibn Umar ibn Abd al-Aziz. During his brief tenure, Mansur tried to dismiss the governor of Khurasan, Nasr ibn Sayyar, but the latter managed to maintain his post. Yazid III died in September 744 after a reign of barely six months. Apparently due to the advice of the Qadariyya, he had appointed his brother, Ibrahim, as his successor, but he did not enjoy much support and was immediately faced with the revolt of Marwan II (r. 744–750), the grandson of Marwan I (r. 684–685) and governor of al-Jazira (Upper Mesopotamia).

== Rise of Marwan II ==
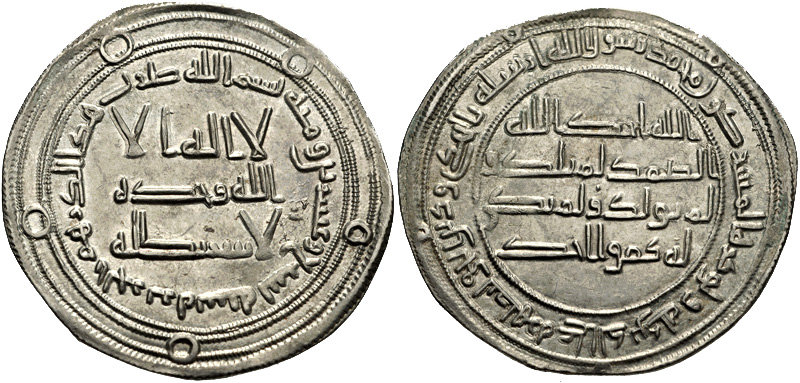
Silver dirham of Marwan II

Reportedly, Marwan II, who for several years had supervised the campaigns against the Byzantines and the Khazars on the Caliphate's northwestern frontiers, had considered claiming the caliphate at the death of al-Walid II, but a Kalbi rebellion had forced him to wait. Instead, Yazid III appointed him governor to Upper Mesopotamia and he took up residence in the Qays-dominated city of Harran.

=== Syria ===
Map of Syria with its major cities and administrative divisions (junds) in the early Islamic period

Following Yazid III's death in 744, Marwan marched into Syria, claiming that he came to restore the throne to al-Walid II's two imprisoned sons. The local Qaysis of the northern districts of Qinnasrin and Hims flocked to his banner. At some point, on the road leading from Baalbek to Damascus, Sulayman, who had previously been flogged and imprisoned by al-Walid II, confronted Marwan II. With him, Sulayman had the Kalbis of southern Syria and the Dhakwāniyya, his 5,000 men strong personal army, maintained from his own funds and estates and recruited mostly from the mawālī (non-Arab Muslims). Marwan II defeated Sulayman who fled to Damascus. Marwan II forced the prisoners he had taken in the battle to pledge allegiance to al-Walid II's sons, whereupon the sons were killed by Yazid ibn Khalid al-Qasri on Sulayman's orders, along with Yusuf al-Thaqafi. Sulayman and his adherents, including the caliph-designate Ibrahim, then fled to Palmyra. Marwan II entered Damascus peacefully at the end of November or December and was declared caliph. Marwan avoided reprisals and followed a conciliatory policy, allowing the Syrian districts (junds) to choose their own governors. Soon Sulayman and Ibrahim came to Damascus and submitted to Marwan II.

Marwan II's hold on power appeared to be stabilizing, but when he moved the capital of the caliphate from Damascus to the military city of Harran it was seen as an abandonment of Syria and the move sowed resentment among the defeated Kalbis. Consequently, in summer 745, the Kalbis of Palestine rose in revolt under the local governor, Thabit ibn Nu'aym. The revolt quickly spread across Syria, even to ostensibly loyal Qaysi areas like Hims. Marwan II had to return to Syria and suppress the revolt city by city. After forcing Hims to surrender, he relieved Damascus from its siege by Yazid ibn Khalid al-Qasri, who was killed. He then rescued Tiberias, which was being besieged by Thabit. Thabit fled and his troops scattered to the winds but this three sons, Nu'aym, Bakr, and Imran were caught and executed. Thabit was later caught together with another son, Rifa'a, and executed. Following Marwan II's attack on the Kalbi's stronghold Palmyra, the Kalbi leader Abrash al-Kalbi also surrendered.

With Syria apparently back in his grip, Marwan II ordered the members of the Umayyad family to gather around him and named his two sons as his heirs. He then focused his attention on Iraq, where an army led by Yazid ibn Umar ibn Hubayra was trying to gain control of the province for him. Marwan II assembled a new army and sent it to aid Ibn Hubayra's. Meanwhile, another rebellion led by the previously defeated Sulayman had broken out in northern Syria. At Rusafa, Marwan II's army deserted to Sulayman's side. It then took Qinnasrin, and once again many Syrians dissatisfied with Marwan II joined them. Marwan II brought the bulk of his forces from Iraq and defeated Sulayman's rebels near Qinnasrin. Sulayman again escaped to Palmyra, and thence flee to Kufa. Most of his surviving troops withdrew to Hims under the command of his brother Sa'id, where they were soon besieged by Marwan II's forces. The siege lasted through the winter of 745–746, but in the end Hims surrendered. Enraged at the repeated Syrian revolts despite his earlier leniency, Marwan II now, in the summer of 746, moved to prevent any further resistance by tearing down the walls of most important Syrian towns, including Hims, Damascus and possibly also Jerusalem.

=== Egypt and Iraq ===
Opposition to Marwan and his Qaysis was also evident in Egypt, where the governor Hafs ibn al-Walid ibn Yusuf al-Hadrami, a member of the traditionally dominant local Arab settler community, tried to use the turmoil of the civil war to restore its pre-eminence in Egyptian affairs: the Syrians were forcibly expelled from the capital Fustat, and Hafs set about recruiting a force of 30,000 men, named Hafsiya after him, from among the native non-Arab converts (maqamisa and mawālī). Marwan sent Hassan ibn Atahiyah to replace him and ordered the Hafsiya disbanded, but the latter refused to accept the order to disband and mutinied, besieging the new governor in his residence until he and his ṣāḥib al-shurṭa both were forced to leave Egypt. Hafs, though unwilling, was restored by the mutinous troops as governor. In the next year, 745, Marwan dispatched a new governor, Hawthara ibn Suhayl al-Bahili, at the head of a large Syrian army. Despite his supporters' eagerness to resist, Hafs proved willing to surrender his position. Hawthara took Fustat without opposition, but immediately launched a purge, to which Hafs and several Hafsiya leaders fell victim.

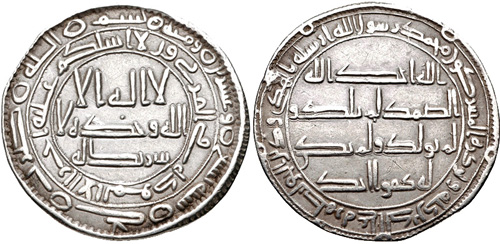
Silver dirham of Abd Allah ibn Mu'awiya, minted in Jayy c. 746/7

In the meantime, in Iraq, Marwan's rebellion coincided with a Alid uprising in Kufa, headed by Abd Allah ibn Mu'awiya, in October 744. The uprising was soon suppressed by Yazid III's governor, Abd Allah ibn Umar, and his Syrian troops, but Ibn Mu'awiya had managed to escape to Jibal. There volunteers opposed to the Umayyad regime continued to flock to his banner, and he managed to extend his control over large parts of Persia, including most of Jibal, Ahwaz, Fars and Kerman. He established his residence first at Isfahan and then at Istakhr. Marwan II appointed a supporter of his own, the Qaysi Nadr ibn Sa'id al-Harashi, as governor of Iraq, but Abd Allah ibn Umar retained the loyalty of the Kalbi majority of the Syrian troops, and for several months the two rival governors and their troops confronted and skirmished at each other around al-Hira. This conflict was abruptly ended with the Kharijite revolt which had begun among the Banu Rabi'ah tribes in Upper Mesopotamia. Although "northerners", the Rabi'a, and especially the Banu Shayban, were enemies of the Mudar and Qays and opposed Marwan II's takeover.

The revolt was initially led by Sa'id ibn Bahdal, but he died soon of the plague, and was succeeded by al-Dahhak ibn Qays al-Shaybani. In early 745 they invaded Iraq and defeated both rival Umayyad governors, who had joined forces, in April/May 745. Nadr fled back to Syria to join Marwan, but Ibn Umar and his followers withdrew to Wasit. In August 745 however Ibn Umar and his supporters surrendered and even embraced Kharijism and Dahhak—who was not even of the Quraysh tribe of Muhammad—as their caliph. Ibn Umar was appointed as Dahhak's governor for Wasit, eastern Iraq, and western Persia, while Dahhak governed western Iraq from Kufa. Taking advantage of the Syrian revolt against Marwan, Dahhak returned to Upper Mesopotamia—probably in spring 746—and while Marwan was occupied by the siege of Hims, he seized Mosul. More men flocked to his banner, whether out of opposition to Marwan, like Sulayman ibn Hisham and the remnant of his Dhakwaniyya, or because he offered high wages to his followers, and his army is said to have reached 120,000 men. Marwan sent his son Abd Allah to oppose Dahhak, but the Kharijite leader managed to blockade him in Nisibis. Once Hims had fallen, however, Marwan himself campaigned against Dahhak, and in a battle at al-Ghazz in Kafartuta in August/September 746, Dahhak was killed and the Kharijites had to abandon Upper Mesopotamia. The Kharijites now selected Abu Dulaf as their leader, and on the advice of Sulayman ibn Hisham they withdrew to the eastern bank of the Tigris. As Marwan was able to call upon more and more troops to face the Kharijites, however, they were forced to abandon even this position and withdraw further east. Marwan then sent Yazid ibn Umar ibn Hubayra to establish control over Iraq, which he accomplished by the summer of 747 after defeating the Kharijite governor of Kufa and taking the city. Ibn Hubayra then marched on Wasit, where he captured Abd Allah ibn Umar.

Marwan's capture of Iraq left Abd Allah ibn Mu'awiya as the only major leader opposing the Umayyad caliph, and his domain in western Persia became a refuge for the defeated Kharijites of Iraq, and every other opponent of Marwan, including members of the Umayyad family—notably Sulayman ibn Hisham—and even a few Abbasids. Nevertheless, in a short time Ibn Mu'awiya's forces suffered a decisive defeat by one of Ibn Hubayra's generals. Ibn Mu'awiya fled to Khurasan, where the leader of the Abbasid Revolution, Abu Muslim, had him executed, while Sulayman ibn Hisham and Mansur ibn Jumhur fled to India, where they remained until they died.

=== Arabia ===
In Yemen (southwestern Arabia), the weakening of Umayyad power led to the outbreak of the most serious revolt the country experienced under Umayyad rule. It was headed by Talib al-Haqq, a former Umayyad judge in Hadramawt who proclaimed himself caliph in 745. With support from the Ibadi Kharijites of Oman, he advanced onto the regional capital Sana'a, while his army occupied Mecca and Medina. Even Basra in southern Iraq for a while swore allegiance to him. Minor tribal revolts were led at the same time by the Himyarites Yahya ibn Karib and Yahya ibn Abd Allah al-Sabbaq. These uprisings were finally suppressed in 747 by Marwan's general Abd al-Malik ibn Atiyya, but he was recalled too soon to lead the Hajj, forcing him to make pacts with some of the rebels in exchange for peace.

== Khurasan and the Abbasid Revolution ==
Khurasan, the northeasternmost province of the Caliphate, had not escaped the turmoils of the civil war. Yazid III's accession posed a threat to the longtime governor, Nasr ibn Sayyar, as the numerous Yaman in Khurasan sought to replace him with their champion, Juday al-Kirmani. Nasr tried to secure his own position by deposing al-Kirmani from his leadership of the Azd tribe, as well as by trying to win over Azd and Rabi'ah leaders, but his efforts only led to a general uprising by these tribes under al-Kirmani. It is indicative of the lingering intertribal antagonism of the late Umayyad world that the rebellion was launched in the name of revenge for the Muhallabids, an Azdi family that had been purged after rebelling in 720, an act which had since become a symbol of Yamani resentment of the Umayyads and their northern Arab-dominated regime. Nasr imprisoned al-Kirmani in the provincial capital, Merv, but he managed to escape in summer 744. Despite Nasr's eventual re-confirmation as governor by Yazid, the rebellion spread among the Arabs of Khurasan, so that Nasr was forced to turn to the exiled rebel al-Harith ibn Surayj. Al-Kirmani had played a major role in the latter's defeat years ago, and Ibn Surayj's northern Arab (Tamimi) origin made him a natural enemy of the Yamani. Ibn Surayj however had other designs; gathering a following of many of the Tamimis and the disaffected Arabs of the province, he launched an attack on Merv in March 746. After it failed, he made common cause with al-Kirmani.

With Marwan II still trying to consolidate his own position in Syria and Mesopotamia, and western Persia controlled by the Kharijites under Ibn Mu'awiya, Nasr was bereft of any hopes of reinforcement. The allied armies of Ibn Surayj and al-Kirmani drove him out of Merv towards the end of the year, and he retreated to the Qaysi stronghold of Nishapur. Within days al-Kirmani and Ibn Surayj fell out among themselves and clashed, resulting in the latter's death. Al-Kirmani then destroyed the Tamimi quarters in Merv, a shocking act, as dwellings were traditionally considered exempt from warfare in Arab culture. As a result, the Mudari tribes, hitherto ambivalent towards Nasr, now came over to him. Backed by them, especially the Qaysis of Nishapur, Nasr now resolved to take back the capital. During summer 747, Nasr's and al-Kirmani's armies confronted each other before the walls of Merv, occupying two fortified camps and skirmishing with each other for several months. The fighting stopped only when news came of the start of the Hashimiyya uprising under Abu Muslim. Negotiations commenced, but were almost broken off when a member of Nasr's entourage, an embittered son of Ibn Surayj, attacked and killed al-Kirmani. The two sides were able to tentatively settle their differences, and Nasr re-occupied his seat in Merv.

== Victory of the Abbasids ==
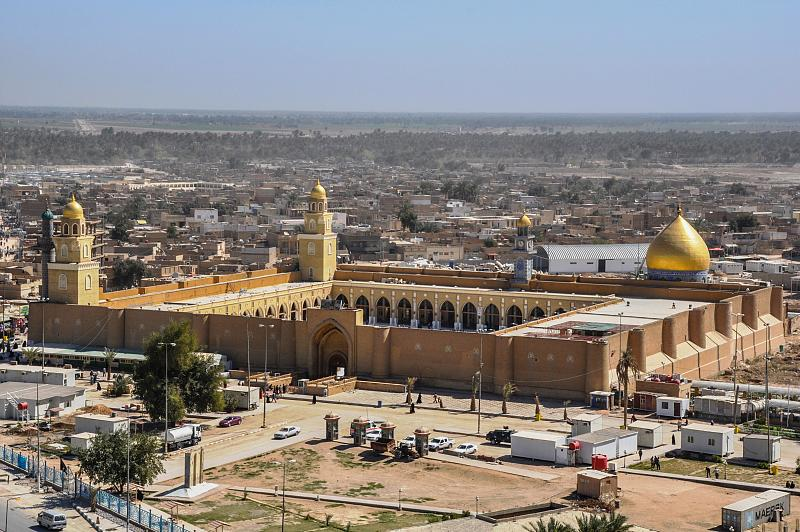
A view of modern-day Kufa and its Great Mosque, where Saffah was proclaimed caliph

The exact origins and nature of the Hashimiyya movement are debated among scholars, but by the 740s this movement, which supported the overthrow of the Umayyads and their replacement by a "chosen one from the family of Muhammad" (al-Riḍā min Āl Muḥammad), had spread widely among the Arabs of Khurasan. In 746 or 747, Abu Muslim was sent to Khurasan by the Abbasid imam, Ibrahim, to assume the leadership of the sect there, possibly in order to bring it more under Abbasid control. In a short time Abu Muslim established his control of the Khurasani Hashimiyya, and in summer 747, at the Yamano village of Sikadanj, the black banners were unfurled, the prayer read in the name of the Abbasid imam, and the Abbasid Revolution begun. Abu Muslim soon took advantage of the barely mended Mudari–Yamani hostility, by persuading al-Kirmani's son and successor Ali that Nasr had been involved in his father's murder. As a result, both Ali al-Kirmani and Nasr separately appealed for aid against each other to Abu Muslim, who now held the balance of power. The latter eventually chose to support the Yaman, and on 14 February 748, Abu Muslim's army occupied Merv. Nasr ibn Sayyar once again fled to Nishapur, while Abu Muslim sent the Hashimiyya forces under Qahtaba ibn Shabib al-Ta'i to pursue him. Nasr was forced to abandon Nishapur too after his son Tamim was defeated at Tus, and retreat to the region of Qumis, on the western borderlands of Khurasan. At this point, the long-awaited reinforcements from the Caliph arrived, but their general and Nasr failed to coordinate their movements, and Qahtaba was able to defeat the caliphal army at Gurgan in August 748 and capture Rayy. Following the capture of Nishapur, Abu Muslim consolidated his position in Khurasan by murdering Ali ibn Juday al-Kirmani and his brother Uthman.

Qahtaba's son al-Hasan ibn Qahtaba led the siege of Nihawand, where the remnants of the caliphal armies and Nasr ibn Sayyar's followers made their last stand. In March 749, Qahtaba defeated another, bigger, caliphal army near Isfahan. Bereft of hope of further aid, Nihawand surrendered two or three months later, opening the way to Iraq. Qahtaba led his troops towards Kufa, but on the way they were confronted by Marwan II's governor Yazid ibn Umar ibn Hubayra. After a surprise night attack in which Qahtaba was killed on 27 August 749, Ibn Hubayra was forced to withdraw to Wasit, and al-Hasan ibn Qahtaba led his army into Kufa on 2 September. As imam Ibrahim had been imprisoned and executed by Marwan II, he was succeeded by his brother, Abu'l-Abbas (r. 749–754), whom the army leaders proclaimed as caliph on 28 November. In January 750, at the Battle of the Greater Zab, the Abbasid army decisively defeated the Umayyad army led by Marwan II in person. Pursued by the Abbasids, Marwan was forced to flee to Syria and then Egypt, where he was finally captured and executed in August 750, putting an end to the Umayyad Caliphate. Saffah established Kufa as the capital of the caliphate, ending the dominance of Damascus in the Islamic political world.

== Sources ==
- Blankinship, Khalid Yahya (1994). The End of the Jihâd State: The Reign of Hishām ibn ʻAbd al-Malik and the Collapse of the Umayyads. Albany, New York: State University of New York Press. ISBN 978-0-7914-1827-7.
- Foltz, Richard C. (2016). Iran in World History. Oxford University Press. ISBN 9780199335497.
- Gardet, Louis (1965). "Fitna". In Lewis, B.; Pellat, Ch. & Schacht, J. (eds.). The Encyclopaedia of Islam, Second Edition. Volume II: C–G. Leiden: E. J. Brill. pp. 930–931. OCLC 495469475.
- Gil, Moshe (1997) [1983]. A History of Palestine, 634–1099. Translated by Ethel Broido. Cambridge: Cambridge University Press. ISBN 0-521-59984-9.
- Hawting, Gerald R. (2000). The First Dynasty of Islam: The Umayyad Caliphate AD 661–750 (Second ed.). London and New York: Routledge. ISBN 0-415-24072-7.
- Kennedy, Hugh (1998). "Egypt as a province in the Islamic caliphate, 641–868". In Petry, Carl F. (ed.). The Cambridge History of Egypt: Islamic Egypt, 640–1517. Vol. 1. Cambridge: Cambridge University Press. pp. 62–85. ISBN 0-521-47137-0.
- Landau-Tasseron, Ella (2010). "Arabia". In Robinson, Chase F. (ed.). The New Cambridge History of Islam, Volume 1: The Formation of the Islamic World, Sixth to Eleventh Centuries. Cambridge: Cambridge University Press. pp. 397–447. ISBN 978-0-521-83823-8.
- Shaban, M. A. (1979). The ʿAbbāsid Revolution. Cambridge: Cambridge University Press. ISBN 0-521-29534-3.
- Sharon, Moshe (1990). Revolt: the social and military aspects of the ʿAbbāsid revolution. Jerusalem: Graph Press Ltd. ISBN 965-223-388-9.
- Veccia Vaglieri, Laura (1965). "al-Ḍaḥḥāk b. Qays al-Shaybānī". In Lewis, B.; Pellat, Ch. & Schacht, J. (eds.). The Encyclopaedia of Islam, Second Edition. Volume II: C–G. Leiden: E. J. Brill. p. 90. OCLC 495469475.
- Zetterstéen, K. V. (1987). "ʿAbd Allāh b. Muʿāwiya". In Houtsma, Martijn Theodoor (ed.). E.J. Brill's First Encyclopaedia of Islam, 1913–1936, Volume I: A–Bābā Beg. Leiden: BRILL. pp. 26–27. ISBN 90-04-08265-4.
