= Khalid al-Qasri =

8th century Umayyad official and Governor

Khalid ibn Abdallah ibn Asad al-Qasri
- Born: Damascus
- Died: 743
- Years active: 702/5/7–743
- Known for: Umayyad governor of Mecca and Iraq; champion of the Yaman in the Qays–Yaman rivalry
- Children: Yazid ibn Khalid; Muhammad ibn Khalid
- Father: Abdallah ibn Yazid al-Qasri

Khālid ibn ʿAbdallāh al-Qasrī (Arabic: خالد بن عبد الله القسري; died 743) was an Arab who served the Umayyad Caliphate as governor of Mecca in the 8th century and of Iraq from 724 until 738. The latter post, entailing as it did control over the entire eastern Caliphate, made him one of the most important officials during the crucial reign of Caliph Hisham ibn Abd al-Malik. He is most notable for his support of the Yaman tribes in the conflict with the Qays who dominated the administration of Iraq and the East under his predecessor and successor. Following his dismissal, he was twice imprisoned and in 734 tortured to death by his successor, Yusuf ibn Umar al-Thaqafi.

== Origin and early life ==
Khalid was born in Damascus. He was a member of the Tihamite Qasr clan, a subtribe of the Bajila, of which his great-grandfather Asad ibn Kurz al-Qasri is said by some traditions to have been the chief in the times of Muhammad, and is accounted as one of the Prophet's Companions. Other traditions, however, hostile to Khalid, report that Asad was a runaway Jewish slave. Khalid's grandfather Yazid was an early and prominent supporter of the Umayyads in the First Fitna, while Khalid's father Abdallah sided with Ibn al-Zubayr in the Second Fitna, but was eventually pardoned by the Caliph Abd al-Malik (r. 685–705). Khalid's mother was a Christian.

Khalid possibly served as governor of Rayy in 702, but his first secure appointment is as governor of Mecca. The dates of this appointment are unclear, as al-Tabari mentions his appointment twice in 707/8 and 709/10, under al-Walid I (r. 705–715), but other traditions report that he held the post already under Abd al-Malik in 705. Similarly, although his tenure is held to have ended with the accession of Sulayman in 715, the historian al-Azraqi reports traditions that he continued to govern Mecca into Sulayman's reign. His governorship of Mecca is remembered chiefly for acts such as the decoration of the Kaaba with gold or measures to regulate the local cult, such as the segregation of genders during the tawaf. Khalid also constructed a fountain, at the behest of the Caliph, to serve the pilgrims, and boasted of its superiority to the bitter water of the sacred Zamzam Well. During this time he also reportedly proclaimed that he would be willing, as a measure of his loyalty to the dynasty, if the Caliph so ordered, to tear down the Kaaba and transport it to Jerusalem.

== Governorship of Iraq ==
After his dismissal from Mecca, he is next mentioned as one of the two envoys sent by Caliph Yazid II (r. 720–724) to the former governor of Iraq, Yazid ibn al-Muhallab, hoping to prevent his rebellion. In 724, on the accession of Hisham ibn Abd al-Malik (r. 724–743), Khalid was himself appointed as governor of Iraq, replacing Umar ibn Hubayra. His authority extended over the entire eastern Caliphate, except for Khurasan, which was sometimes separated from Iraq's authority. When Khurasan was under his jurisdiction, he appointed his brother, Asad, to its governorship (725–727 and 734–738).

As his native Bajila tribe was relatively weak and unaligned in the pervasive conflict between the Qays and Yaman tribal groups of the period, Khalid's appointment to Iraq may have been a move designed to calm the situation there, which had been exacerbated by the brutal suppression of the Muhallabid rebellion by the Qaysi Syro-Jaziran army and the subsequent solidly Qaysi regime of Ibn Hubayra. In the event, however, this backfired: the Qaysis resented Khalid for his replacement of their champion, Ibn Hubayra, while the Yamanis themselves did not support him wholeheartedly, even though he staffed his administration with Yamanis; it was only his replacement in 738 with another Qaysi governor, Yusuf ibn Umar al-Thaqafi, that confirmed Khalid as a "Yamani" governor in the later tradition.

Details of his long tenure are relatively unknown. With the exception of the suppression of a Kharijite revolt of Bahlul ibn Bishr al-Shaybani in the north and a Shi'ite extremist movement of al-Mughira ibn Sa'id in Kufa and of Wazir al-Sikhtiyani in al-Hirah in 737, his governorship seems to have been generally peaceful. He is also held responsible for the execution of al-Ja'd ibn Dirham, a "rather shadowy figure associated with a variety of religious doctrines". During this tenure, Khalid undertook extensive irrigation and land reclamation projects, from which he amassed a huge fortune. His governorship was also marked by the minting of high-quality coinage, by increasing, at the orders of Hisham, the weight of the silver dirham from six to seven daniqs. After his dismissal, this change was reverted. Khalid is also accused by some late anti-Umayyad traditions of having been ambivalent or even hostile towards Islam. These same late traditions presented him as a sceptic or an atheist (zindiq) and favourably disposed towards the non-Muslim groups, especially the Christians. it states that he was derisively called "Ibn al-Nasraniyya" on the account of his alleged maternal ties to Christians, and is said to have commented on Christianity's superiority to Islam, derided the huffaz, and to have built a church for his mother near the mosque at Kufa.

== Dismissal and death ==
The reasons for Khalid's dismissal in 738 are obscure. Some sources suggest that Hisham became jealous of Khalid's wealth, but the real motive seems to have been Qaysi pressure to relieve him. Khalid certainly was taken by surprise by the arrival of his replacement, Yusuf ibn Umar. Yusuf immediately imprisoned Khalid and his sons, and tortured his predecessor to extract his wealth, a practice common during hand-overs of governorships at the time. After eighteen months, Khalid was released and went to Hisham's capital Rusafa and then to his native Damascus. However, after Hisham died in early 743, his successor al-Walid II (r. 743–744) sold Khalid back to Yusuf ibn Umar for 50 million dirhams. Yusuf again tortured him until Khalid died, an act which further exacerbated the Qays–Yaman feud and led to the downfall of al-Walid II.

Of Khalid's sons, Yazid became a partisan of Yazid III during the Third Fitna and was executed by Marwan II (r. 744–750), while Muhammad joined the Abbasid armies and served as governor of Mecca and Medina.

== Sources ==
- Blankinship, Khalid Yahya (1994). The End of the Jihâd State: The Reign of Hishām ibn ʻAbd al-Malik and the Collapse of the Umayyads. Albany, New York: State University of New York Press. ISBN 978-0-7914-1827-7.
- Crone, Patricia (1980). Slaves on Horses: The Evolution of the Islamic Polity (1980 ed.). Cambridge: Cambridge University Press. ISBN 978-0521229616.
- Hawting, G. R. (1978). "K̲h̲ālid b. ʿAbd Allāh al-Ḳasrī". In van Donzel, E.; Lewis, B.; Pellat, Ch. & Bosworth, C. E. (eds.). The Encyclopaedia of Islam, Second Edition. Volume IV: Iran–Kha. Leiden: E. J. Brill. pp. 925–927. OCLC 758278456.
- Hawting, G. R (2000). The First Dynasty of Islam: The Umayyad Caliphate AD 661-750 (2nd ed.). Routledge. ISBN 978-1-134-55059-3.

Preceded by Umar ibn Hubayra	Governor of Iraq; 724–738	Succeeded by Yusuf ibn Umar al-Thaqafi
