= Ma'n ibn Za'ida al-Shaybani =

8th-century Arab military general

- معن بن زائدة الشيباني
- Born: Unknown
- Died: 769/70
- Burial place: Bust
- Relatives: Yazid ibn Mazyad al-Shaybani (nephew), Ahmad ibn Mazyad al-Shaybani (nephew)
- Military career
- Allegiance: Umayyad Caliphate, Abbasid Caliphate
- Branch: Umayyad army, Abbasid army
- Rank: General
- Conflicts: Siege of Wasit, Rawandiyya rebellion, Kharijite rebellion
- Awards: Full pardon and place at court by Caliph al-Mansur
- Other work: Governor of Yemen, Governor of Sistan

Abu'l-Walid Ma'n ibn Za'ida al-Shaybani (Arabic: معن بن زائدة الشيباني) (died 769/70) was an 8th-century Arab general of the Shayban tribe, who served both the Umayyads and the Abbasids.

== Under the Umayyads ==
Ma'n was a member of the nobility of the Shayban tribe, settled in the Jazira, and the first member of his family to rise to prominence. He entered the service of the Umayyad Caliphate, and under the patronage of the powerful governor of Iraq, Yazid ibn Umar ibn Hubayra, was sent to command against Abdallah ibn Mu'awiya in Fars in 746/7.

During the Abbasid Revolution, he returned to Iraq and fought against the Abbasids at the Siege of Wasit, again under Ibn Hubayra's command; indeed, he was one of those who claimed to have killed the Abbasid commander Qahtaba ibn Shabib al-Ta'i. He was spared the execution of the leaders of the Wasit garrison after their surrender, having been sent to Kufa to submit to Caliph al-Saffah on Ibn Hubayra's behalf.

== Under the Abbasids ==
After this he remained in hiding until 758/9, when he came out of retirement to fight the Rawandiyya rebels. He was so successful in this that the Caliph al-Mansur gave him a full pardon and a place at court. Ma'n was appointed to the governorship of Yemen in 759/60, where he "pacified the country brutally but successfully". In 768 he was recalled from Yemen and sent to govern Sistan. There he managed to defeat the local Kharijite rebels, but was killed by some of their number who disguised themselves as workmen to enter his residence at Bust (769/70).

Ma'n acquired a lasting reputation "as a fierce warrior, but also for his extreme generosity and as a patron of poets, notably Marwan ibn Abi Hafsa, who wrote a famous elegy on Ma'n". At least two of his four sons rose to prominence: Za'ida succeeded him in Yemen, while Sharahil participated in Harun al-Rashid's invasion of the Byzantine Empire in 806. It was his nephews Yazid and Ahmad, however, who succeeded Ma'n in his position, both within the Shayban tribe and at court. Both assumed important provincial governorships and military commands, while Yazid's descendants in particular came to dominate the region of Shirvan, where they later formed a separate dynasty (the shirvanshahs).

== Sources ==
- Bianquis, Thierry (1997). "S̲h̲aybān". In Bosworth, C. E.; van Donzel, E.; Heinrichs, W. P. & Lecomte, G. (eds.). The Encyclopaedia of Islam, Second Edition. Volume IX: San–Sze. Leiden: E. J. Brill. pp. 391–392. ISBN 978-90-04-10422-8.
- Crone, Patricia (1980). Slaves on Horses: The Evolution of the Islamic Polity (1980 ed.). Cambridge: Cambridge University Press. ISBN 978-0521229616.
- Kennedy, Hugh (1991). "Maʿn b. Zāʾida". In Bosworth, C. E.; van Donzel, E. & Pellat, Ch. (eds.). The Encyclopaedia of Islam, Second Edition. Volume VI: Mahk–Mid. Leiden: E. J. Brill. p. 345. ISBN 978-90-04-08112-3.
