= Abd Allah ibn Umar ibn Abd al-Aziz =

Umayyad prince and governor of Iraq (died 750)

Abd Allah ibn Umar ibn Abd al-Aziz عبد الله بن عمر بن عبد العزيز

Governor of Iraq
- In office 744–745
- Monarchs: Yazid III, Ibrahim, Marwan II
- Preceded by: Mansur ibn Jumhur al-Kalbi
- Succeeded by: Al-Nadr ibn Sa'id al-Harashi

Personal details
- Born: 700s Umayyad Caliphate
- Died: c. 750 Harran, Umayyad Caliphate
- Cause of death: Died in prison
- Relations: Abd al-Aziz (brother); Al-Walid I (uncle); Sulayman (uncle); Yazid II (uncle); Hisham (uncle)
- Parents: Umar II (father); Umm Shu'ayb bint Shu'ayb ibn Zabban (Note: Abd Allah's mother was from the Banu Kalb tribe; Umar's wife from the Banu Kalb was Umm Shu'ayb (or Umm Uthman) bint Shu'ayb (or Sa'id) ibn Zabban, Umar's maternal cousin.) (mother)

ʿAbd Allāh ibn ʿUmar ibn ʿAbd al-ʿAzīz (Arabic: عبد الله بن عمر بن عبد العزيز; died 750) was an Umayyad prince, the son of caliph Umar II (r. 717–720), and briefly governor of Iraq under Yazid III in 744–745. In this capacity he quelled the pro-Alid rebellion of Abd Allah ibn Mu'awiya at Kufa, although Ibn Mu'awiya managed to flee to Istakhr in Persia.

Following the death of Yazid III, Marwan II (r. 744–750), who seized the throne, appointed a supporter of his own, the Qaysi al-Nadr ibn Sa'id al-Harashi, as governor of Iraq, but Abd Allah ibn Umar retained the loyalty of the Kalbi majority of the Syrian garrison of Iraq. His mother was a member of the Kalb tribe. Ibn Umar remained at al-Hira, while Nadr and his followers installed themselves at the suburb of Dayr Hind, and for several months the two rival governors and their troops confronted and skirmished with each other around al-Hira.

The conflict between Ibn Umar and al-Nadr was abruptly ended by the Kharijite revolt which had begun among the Banu Rabi'ah tribes in Upper Mesopotamia. Opposed to Marwan II's takeover and the tribes of Mudar and Qays who supported him, the Kharijites elected al-Dahhak ibn Qays al-Shaybani as their caliph, and in early 745 they invaded Iraq and defeated both rival Umayyad governors. Nadr fled back to Syria to join Marwan, but Ibn Umar and his followers withdrew to Wasit. By the summer of 745 however Ibn Umar and his supporters surrendered and even embraced Kharijism and Dahhak—who was not even of the Quraysh tribe of Muhammad—as their caliph. Ibn Umar was appointed as Dahhak's governor for Wasit, eastern Iraq, and western Persia, while Dahhak governed western Iraq from Kufa. After Dahhak was killed by Marwan's army at Kafartuta, Yazid ibn Hubayra was sent to establish Umayyad control over Iraq. Ibn Hubayra defeated the Kharijites at Kufa and then marched on Wasit, where he took Ibn Umar prisoner. He later died in Marwan's prison in Harran alongside his kinsman al-Abbas ibn al-Walid and the Abbasid Ibrahim ibn Muhammad from a plague in the city.

== Sources ==
- Hawting, Gerald R. (2000). The First Dynasty of Islam: The Umayyad Caliphate AD 661–750 (Second ed.). London and New York: Routledge. ISBN 0-415-24072-7.
- Williams, John Alden, ed. (1985). The History of al-Ṭabarī, Volume XXVII: The ʿAbbāsid Revolution, A.D. 743–750/A.H. 126–132. SUNY Series in Near Eastern Studies. Albany, New York: State University of New York Press. ISBN 978-0-87395-884-4.
- Marsham, Andrew (2022). "Kinship, Dynasty, and the Umayyads". The Historian of Islam at Work: Essays in Honor of Hugh N. Kennedy. Leiden: Brill. pp. 12–45. ISBN 978-90-04-52523-8.
- Marsham, Andrew (2024). The Umayyad Empire. Edinburgh: Edinburgh University Press. ISBN 978-1-3995-2739-2.
