= Siege of Wasit =

749–750 siege of the Abbasid Revolution

- Part of Abbasid revolution
Date	August/September 749 – June/July 750
Location	Wasit
Result	Abbasid victory

Belligerents
Abbasid Hashimiyya	Umayyad Caliphate

Commanders and leaders
Al-Mansur; Al-Hasan ibn Qahtaba; Yazid ibn Hatim al-Muhallabi; Khazim ibn Khuzayma	Yazid ibn Umar ibn Hubayra (executed); Ma'n ibn Za'ida al-Shaybani; Hawthara ibn Suhayl (executed)

The siege of Wasit involved the army of the Abbasid revolution under al-Hasan ibn Qahtaba and the future Abbasid caliph al-Mansur, and the Umayyad garrison of Wasit under the last Umayyad governor of Iraq, Yazid ibn Umar ibn Hubayra. Yazid had been forced to abandon Kufa due to a rebellion by Abbasid sympathizers, and fled to Wasit, where he was besieged for 11 months, from August/September 749 to his surrender in June/July 750. The siege was marked by constant sallies and attacks. The defenders bombarded the Abbasid forces with stones hurled from mangonels within the city, while the Abbasids attempted to destroy a pontoon bridge connecting the two parts of Wasit across the river. The defenders used small boats and hooks to tow away the fireships sent against it. Fighting also took place at night along the walls and towers lining the moat, where the defenders lit torches to illuminate the attackers. Meanwhile, the elderly Umayyad commander Yazid ibn Umar ibn Hubayra observed the fighting from a tower above the Bab al-Khallalin gate. As the siege continued, the Umayyad garrison's resistance gradually crumbled, with the final defenders reportedly consisting of fityan and saʿalik, perhaps referring to regular soldiers loyal to Ibn Hubayra and local mercenaries or irregulars. After news of the defeat of the Umayyad caliph Marwan II at the Battle of the Zab and the Abbasid conquest of Syria arrived at Wasit, defections began. Yazid nevertheless held out for a few more months, until he received a pardon for himself and his followers from the Abbasid caliph al-Saffah. Nevertheless, Yazid and his senior officers were executed soon after on al-Saffah's orders.

== Sources ==
- Elad, Amikam (1986). "The Siege of al-Wāsiṭ (132/749): Some Aspects of ʿAbbāsid and ʿAlīd Relations at the Beginning of ʿAbbāsid Rule". In Sharon, Moshe (ed.). Studies in Islamic History and Civilization: In Honour of Professor David Ayalon. Jerusalem and Leiden: Can. pp. 59–90. ISBN 965-264-014-X.
- Williams, John Alden, ed. (1985). The History of al-Ṭabarī, Volume XXVII: The ʿAbbāsid Revolution, A.D. 743–750/A.H. 126–132. SUNY Series in Near Eastern Studies. Albany, New York: State University of New York Press. pp. 185–191. ISBN 978-0-87395-884-4.
- Nicolle, David (2012). Saracen Strongholds AD 630–1050: The Middle East and Central Asia. Bloomsbury Publishing. ISBN 978-1-84603-856-3.
