= Umar ibn Hubayra =

Umayyad governor and general

Umayyad governor of Jazira
- In office 718 or 720 – Unknown
- Monarch: Umar II

Umayyad governor of Iraq
- In office 721–724
- Monarch: Yazid II
- Preceded by: Maslama ibn Abd al-Malik
- Succeeded by: Khalid al-Qasri

Personal details
- Died: 724 or 726
- Children: Yazid ibn Umar
- Parent: Hubayra

Military service
- Battles/wars: Siege of Constantinople (717–718); Campaign into the Byzantine province of Armenia IV (721)

Umar ibn Hubayra al-Fazari (Arabic: عمر بن هبيرة الفزاري, romanized: ʿUmar ibn Hubayra al-Fazārī; fl. 696–724/726) was a prominent Umayyad general and governor of Iraq, who played an important role in the Qays–Yaman conflict of this period.

== Origin and early career ==
A Qaysi from the Jazira, Umar claimed to belong to the traditional Arab nobility by virtue of his maternal grandfather, who was supposedly chief of the Banu Uday branch of the Fazara tribe. However, the family is unknown from the sources until the emergence of Umar himself in 696, when he served in Iraq under Sufyan ibn al-Abrad al-Kalbi.

Umar participated in the campaigns against the Byzantine Empire in the 710s, and under the command of Maslama ibn Abd al-Malik, commanded the Muslim fleet in 715/716, during the initial stages of the unsuccessful campaign to capture the Byzantine capital, Constantinople. (Note: The 13th-century historian Michael the Syrian has Umar in charge of the army's supplies; according to Blankinship, "a crucial role, and one that probably had a lot to do with the fleet".) In the next year, Maslama sent him as envoy to the Byzantine emperor, Leo III the Isaurian.

== Governorship of the Jazira and of Iraq ==
Despite the failure of the campaign, he was appointed governor of the Jazira (in 718 or 720), and, about a year after the accession of Yazid II (720 or 721), he was named governor of Iraq, replacing his patron Maslama. This was a post of critical importance, encompassing at the time the entire eastern Caliphate, including all of Iran and Khurasan. In Khurasan, on the Caliph's instructions, he appointed first his fellow Qaysi, Sa'id ibn Amr al-Harashi, as deputy governor. Al-Harashi proved a capable commander against the Soghdian rebels, but too harsh in his dealings with domestic quarrels, even executing prisoners whose life Umar had guaranteed. As a result, he was replaced by Muslim ibn Sa'id al-Kilabi.

In 721, Umar led a campaign into the Byzantine province of Armenia IV, where he seized 700 prisoners.

Yazid II's accession marked a renewed ascendancy of the Qaysi party at court, and a return to the oppressive policies of the notorious al-Hajjaj ibn Yusuf, interrupted only by the brief reformist reign of Umar II. In the wake of the suppression of Yazid ibn al-Muhallab's rebellion in Iraq, the province was held down in virtual occupation by the regime's trusted Qaysi Syro-Jaziran troops, and Umar appointed almost exclusively his fellow north Arab Qaysis to provincial governorships, virtually excluding the south Arab (Yamani) tribes, traditionally dominant in Iraq, from power. His partisanship was so blatant that the contemporary Iraqi poet al-Farazdaq called him the "glory and supreme support" of the northern Arabs.

Indeed, when Caliph Hisham ibn Abd al-Malik came to power in 724, one of his first acts was to dismiss Umar from his post, and replace him with Khalid al-Qasri, whose tribal origin made him neutral in the Qays–Yaman conflict. Umar was tortured and freed only after giving up a considerable part of his fortune. His followers arranged for him to flee to Syria, where he was given shelter by Maslama and later by Caliph Hisham himself. He died sometime between 724 and 726.

== Legacy ==
The Islamic scholar Jean-Claude Vadet assesses Umar's governorship thus: "Harsh in his treatment of those he conquered, Ibn Hubayra seems to have governed in the name of Arabism and Islam, regarded as a religion of the sword. His methods of governing, however, were not above reproach, although in fact this great Arab nobleman, proud of belonging to the Ghatafan, was accused more of cynicism than of corruption." The historian Hugh Kennedy calls him a "Qaysi thug", and "violent and brutal" in his persecution of Yamani leaders.

As a result of his fervent championship of the Qays in the Qays–Yaman conflict, both he, and his son, Yazid, who would serve as governor of Iraq under Marwan II, receive a very negative treatment in the sources. The only exception are a series of more intimate anecdotes preserved by Ibn Asakir, showing Umar dealing with poets and religious scholars, as well as showing mercy to enemies. It is unclear, however, whether this material is contemporary or represents later attempts to rehabilitate his legacy.

== Sources ==
- Blankinship, Khalid Yahya (1994). The End of the Jihâd State: The Reign of Hishām ibn ʻAbd al-Malik and the Collapse of the Umayyads. Albany, New York: State University of New York Press. ISBN 978-0-7914-1827-7.
- Crone, Patricia (1980). Slaves on Horses: The Evolution of the Islamic Polity (1980 ed.). Cambridge: Cambridge University Press. ISBN 978-0521229616.
- Judd, Steven C. (2019). "ʿUmar b. Hubayra". In Fleet, Kate; Krämer, Gudrun; Matringe, Denis; Nawas, John; Rowson, Everett (eds.). Encyclopaedia of Islam (3rd ed.). Brill Online. doi:10.1163/1573-3912_ei3_COM_30822. ISSN 1873-9830.
- Kennedy, Hugh (2004) [1986]. The Prophet and the Age of the Caliphates: The Islamic Near East from the 6th to the 11th Century (Second ed.). Harlow: Longman. ISBN 978-0-582-40525-7.
- Vadet, J.-C. (1971). "Ibn Hubayra". In Lewis, B.; Ménage, V. L.; Pellat, Ch. & Schacht, J. (eds.). The Encyclopaedia of Islam, Second Edition. Volume III: H–Iram. Leiden: E. J. Brill. p. 802. OCLC 495469525.

Preceded by Maslama ibn Abd al-Malik	Governor of Iraq; 721–724	Succeeded by Khalid al-Qasri
