= Abd Allah ibn Umar =

Abd Allāh ibn ʿUmar (Arabic: عبد الله بن عمر) may refer to:

- Abd Allah ibn Umar ibn Makhzum (died late 5th-century), chief of the Banu Makhzum and father of al-Mughira ibn Abd Allah
- Abd Allah ibn Umar ibn al-Khattab (died 693), a son of caliph Umar (r. 634–644)
- Abd Allah ibn Umar ibn Abd al-Aziz (died 750), a son of caliph Umar II (r. 717–720)

== See also ==
- Abd Allah ibn Amr
