= Capture of Arachosia =

Wild military expeditions of the VIII century

- Part of Muslim conquests of Afghanistan
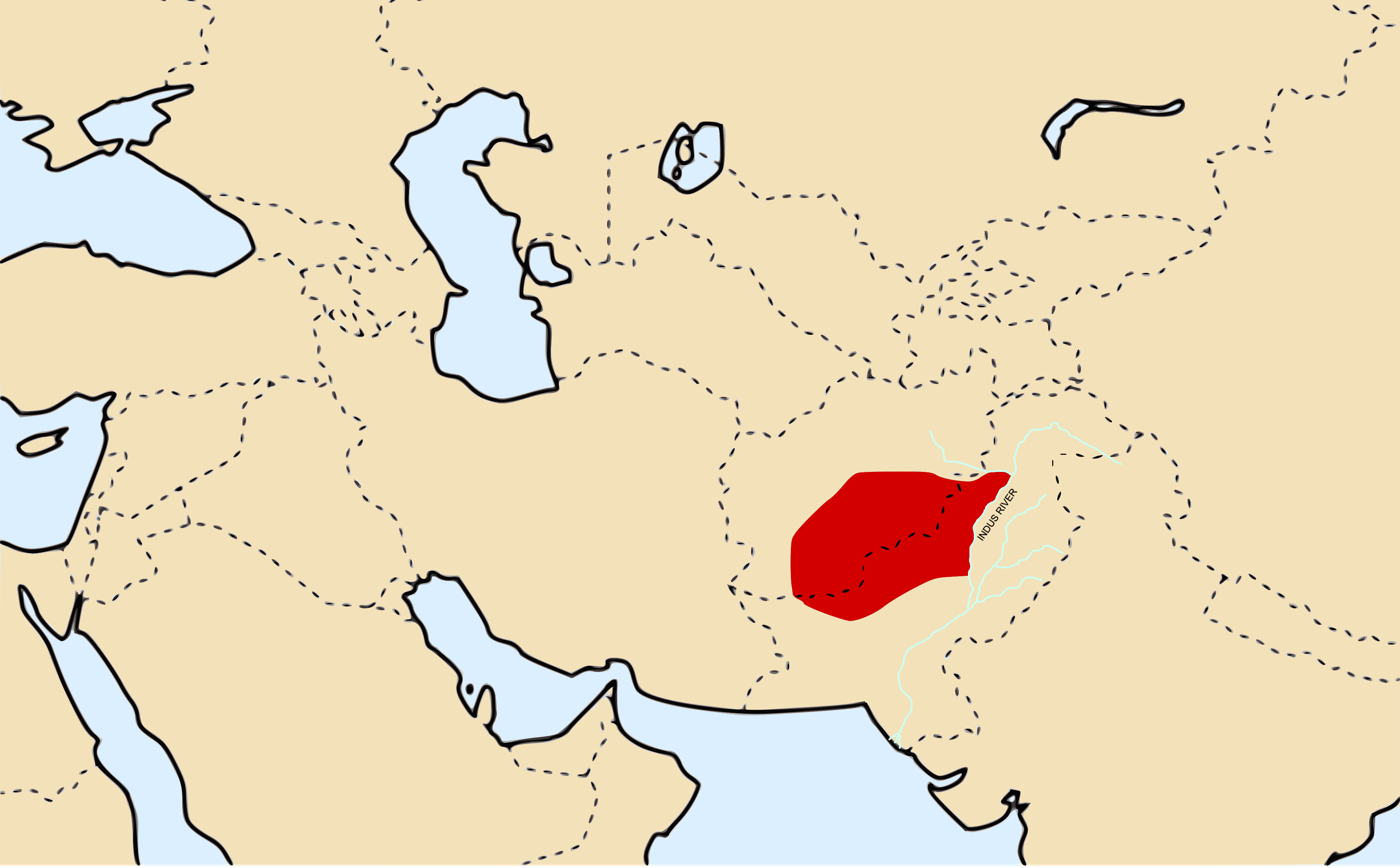
- Map of arachosia on the Asian level
Date	769
Location	Arachosia
Result	Abbasid victory
Territorial changes	Arakosia's subordination to Abbasid Caliphate

Belligerents
Abbasid Caliphate	Zunbil dynasty

Commanders and leaders
Caliph al-Mansur; Ma'n ibn Za'ida; Yazid ibn Mazyad	Rutbil; Mawand (POW) (surrendered)

Strength
Unknow	Unknow

Casualties and losses
Unknow	35,000 Captive
- massacre of many Captive

The capture of Arachosia in 769 was a military expedition led by the Abbasid general Ma'n ibn Za'ida al-Shaybani. He was the governor of Sijistan. The campaign was against the Zunbils, who were the local rulers of Arachosia (modern day southern Afghanistan) where 35,000 were captured.

== Background ==
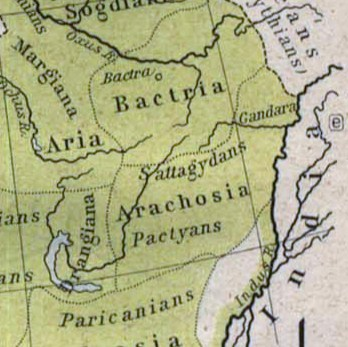
The region of Arachosia during 500 BC

The second Abbasid Caliph al-Mansur, appointed Ma'n ibn Za'ida al-Shaybani as the governor of Sijistan. After his arrival, Ma'n wanted to strengthen Abbasid authority. He demanded the payment of the annual tribute (tax). This tax was originally agreed upon during the time of the Umayyad governor Al-Hajjaj ibn Yusuf.

The Zunbil ruler tried to pay the tax by sending camels, Turkish tents, and slaves. However, he raised the value of these goods to double their real price. Ma'n saw this as an act of defiance and a broken agreement.

== The Campaign in Arachosia ==
Ma'n gathered his army and marched toward Arachosia. He put Yezid ibn Mazyad al-Shaybani in command of the vanguard (the front of the army).

When the Zunbil ruler heard the Abbasids were coming, he chose to avoid a direct fight. He moved from the lowlands of Arachosia to the mountains of Zabulistan. The mountains were cooler and easier to defend during the summer. Ma'n’s forces found the region undefended. They captured the territory, took many goods, and took about 30,000 captives.

While leaving Arachosia, Ma'n saw a huge cloud of dust on the horizon. He feared that the Zunbil's army had returned to attack and free the prisoners. To stop the prisoners from joining the enemy, Ma'n ordered his soldiers to kill them immediately.

Many prisoners were killed before the source of the dust was identified. It was soon discovered that the cloud was not caused by an army. It was caused by a large herd of wild asses running across the plains. When Ma'n realized the mistake, he ordered his men to stop the killing.

== Aftermath ==
After the destruction of Arachosia, a high-ranking official named Mawand contacted Ma'n. Mawand was a relative or deputy of the Zunbil. He wanted to negotiate peace. Mawand asked for safe passage if he could go to see the Caliph himself.

Ma'n agreed to the request. He sent Mawand to Baghdad with 5,000 elite soldiers. Caliph al-Mansur welcomed the delegation with honor. He gave Mawand an official position and made his followers part of the Abbasid military.
