= Yusuf ibn Umar al-Thaqafi =

Yusuf ibn Umar al-Thaqafi (Arabic: يوسف بن عمر الثقفي) was a senior provincial governor for the Umayyad Caliphate. His policies during his tenure as governor of Iraq in 738–744 deepened the Qays–Yaman rivalry and were one of the main factors in the outbreak of the civil war of the Third Fitna, during which he was executed.

== Biography ==
A member of the Thaqif tribe, he was related to the powerful governor of Iraq, al-Hajjaj ibn Yusuf al-Thaqafi, who was a first cousin of his father. In 725–738 he served as governor of the Yemen, where he suppressed a Kharijite rebellion, killing its leader, Abbad al-Ru'yani. According to one tradition, he was responsible for the death of the traditionist Wahb ibn Munabbih during his tenure there. His brother Qasim also served as governor of the Yemen in the 740s.

In 738, Caliph Hisham ibn Abd al-Malik (r. 724–743) appointed Yusuf to the governorship of Iraq, replacing the longtime governor, Khalid al-Qasri. The reasons behind this move are obscure; Khalid certainly was taken by surprise by the arrival of his replacement, and Yusuf immediately imprisoned Khalid and his sons, and tortured his predecessor to extract his wealth, a practice common during hand-overs of governorships at the time. Khalid was released after 18 months, but when Caliph Hisham died in 743 and was replaced by al-Walid II (r. 743–744), the latter sold Khalid back to Yusuf for 50 million dirhams. Yusuf again tortured him until Khalid died in late 743. Yusuf was also responsible for confronting and suppressing the rebellion of the Alid Zayd ibn Ali in 740 at Kufa. Not coincidentally, Yusuf's residence during this tenure was al-Hira rather than Kufa, which was until then the usual residence of the governor.

Himself a "fanatical Qaysi", Yusuf was largely responsible for the exacerbation of the Qays–Yaman rivalry and, according to Khalid Yahya Blankinship, "nearly completed the total breakdown in the ability of the two groups to live in peace in the same state". His appointment marked the shift from a Yamani prevalence under Khalid al-Qasri to a Qays/Mudar dominance, as Yusuf dismissed Khalid's appointees, whom he often mistreated and tortured, and appointed men of Qaysi background in their stead. Yamani hostility deepened further with the handover, murder and death of Khalid al-Qasri, whom the Yamanis had by now come to regard as their champion. The Yamani opposition, in which Khalid's sons played a prominent role, coalesced around Yazid III, a son of al-Walid I (r. 705–715). In April 744, Yazid and his supporters entered Damascus and overthrew al-Walid II, who was soon killed near Palmyra. Yazid III sent the Kalbi Mansur ibn Jumhur to replace Yusuf in Iraq. Yusuf fled to the Balqa, but was soon captured and imprisoned in Damascus along with al-Walid II's sons. As the civil war widened and the pro-Qays Marwan II advanced on the city, Yusuf and al-Walid's sons were killed (late 744 or early 745) by Khalid al-Qasri's son Yazid, on the orders of Sulayman ibn Hisham.

== Sources ==
- Blankinship, Khalid Yahya, ed. (1989). The History of al-Ṭabarī, Volume XXV: The End of Expansion: The Caliphate of Hishām, A.D. 724–738/A.H. 105–120. SUNY Series in Near Eastern Studies. Albany, New York: State University of New York Press. ISBN 978-0-88706-569-9.
- Crone, Patricia (1980). Slaves on Horses: The Evolution of the Islamic Polity. Cambridge: Cambridge University Press. ISBN 0-521-52940-9.
- Hawting, G. R. (2000). "al-T̲h̲aḳafī". In Bearman, P. J.; Bianquis, Th.; Bosworth, C. E.; van Donzel, E. & Heinrichs, W. P. (eds.). The Encyclopaedia of Islam, Second Edition. Volume X: T–U. Leiden: E. J. Brill. pp. 431–432. doi:10.1163/1573-3912_islam_SIM_7513. ISBN 978-90-04-11211-7.
- Hawting, Gerald R. (2000). The First Dynasty of Islam: The Umayyad Caliphate AD 661–750 (Second ed.). London and New York: Routledge. ISBN 0-415-24072-7.

Preceded by Khalid al-Qasri	Governor of Iraq; 738–744	Succeeded by Mansur ibn Jumhur al-Kalbi
