= Yazid ibn Umar ibn Hubayra =

Umayyad provincial governor and military leader (died 750)

Umayyad governor of Qinnasrin
- In office 743–744
- Monarch: al-Walid II

Umayyad governor of Iraq
- In office 745–750
- Monarch: Marwan II
- Preceded by: Al-Nadr ibn Sa'id al-Harashi
- Succeeded by: Isa ibn Musa, Sulayman ibn Ali (Abbasid governors)

Personal details
- Died: 750 Wasit
- Children: Dawud; Muthanna; Mukhallad
- Parent: Umar ibn Hubayra
- Religion: Islam
- Military career
- Allegiance: Umayyad Caliphate
- Rank: Commander

Yazid ibn Umar ibn Hubayra al-Fazari (Arabic: يَزِيد بن عُمَر بن هُبَيْرَة الْفَزارِيّ, romanized: Yazīd ibn ʿUmar ibn Hubayra al-Fazārī; died 750) was the last Umayyad governor of Iraq. A son of former governor Umar ibn Hubayra, he became one of the most important partisans of Caliph Marwan II (r. 744–750) in the Third Fitna, but failed to stem the onslaught of the Abbasid Revolution. Defeated, he was captured and executed by the Abbasids after the Siege of Wasit.

== Origin ==
Like his father, Umar ibn Hubayra, Yazid was a Qaysi from the Jazira, and claimed to belong to the traditional Arab nobility although the family is unknown from the sources until Umar himself. Both father and son are often simply called "Ibn Hubayra" in the sources.

His prestige was such that not only did Caliph Hisham ibn Abd al-Malik (r. 724–743) propose a marriage between Yazid and his granddaughter, the daughter of Hisham's favourite son, Mu'awiya, but Yazid felt able to reject the offer.

In historical sources, Yazid is praised for his valour and military skill, but also for being a generous patron of poets and religious men; Yazid himself is known to have occasionally ventured his opinion on legal issues. His spontaneous generosity was well remembered, as well as his great appetite.

== Role in the Third Fitna ==
In marked difference to his distance to Hisham, he quickly moved to congratulate al-Walid II (r. 743–744) when he acceded to the throne after Hisham's death. In return, al-Walid appointed Yazid as governor of Jund Qinnasrin. After Yazid III overthrew al-Walid II, Yazid opposed the new regime, and shifted his support to Marwan II (r. 744–750), whom he urged to come to Syria.

During the Third Fitna, Yazid plays a crucial role as one of the most important supporters, and perhaps the most capable military commander, of Marwan II. In 745, Marwan appointed Yazid to his father's old governorship of Iraq, which at the time was held by forces opposed to Marwan. Yazid was therefore forced to spend the first years of his office in establishing his authority in his province. In 746 he defeated the Kharijites under al-Dahhak ibn Qays al-Shaybani at Ayn al-Tamr, thereby subduing the Sawad, and managed to extend his control also to Ahwaz, Jibal, and the Jazira.

Preoccupied with these campaigns, however, he neglected lending assistance to the governor of Khurasan, Nasr ibn Sayyar, when he was faced with the outbreak of the Abbasid Revolution. In the event, as the Abbasid armies swept westwards, they defeated Yazid's deputy Amir ibn Dubara and reached Iraq. Yazid managed to inflict heavy casualties on the Abbasids in a battle that cost the life of their commander, Qahtaba ibn Shabib al-Ta'i, but he was chased from Kufa by a rebellion of the Yaman faction, and fled to Wasit. There he was besieged by the Abbasids for eleven months, after which he surrendered to al-Hasan ibn Qahtaba on promises of safety. However, the new Abbasid caliph, al-Saffah (r. 749–754) ordered the death of Yazid and his senior officers soon after; Yazid was killed while he was praying.

Two of his sons, Dawud, who was with Yazid at Wasit, and Muthanna, who was governor of al-Yamama, were also killed by the Abbasids, while a third, Mukhallad, survived in Syria, where he and his descendants retained their influence.

== Sources ==
- Crone, Patricia (1980). Slaves on Horses: The Evolution of the Islamic Polity (1980 ed.). Cambridge: Cambridge University Press. ISBN 978-0521229616.
- Judd, Steven C. (2019). "Yazīd b. ʿUmar b. Hubayra". In Fleet, Kate; Krämer, Gudrun; Matringe, Denis; Nawas, John; Rowson, Everett (eds.). Encyclopaedia of Islam (3rd ed.). Brill Online. doi:10.1163/1573-3912_ei3_COM_36664. ISSN 1873-9830.
- Vadet, J.-C. (1971). "Ibn Hubayra". In Lewis, B.; Ménage, V. L.; Pellat, Ch. & Schacht, J. (eds.). The Encyclopaedia of Islam, Second Edition. Volume III: H–Iram. Leiden: E. J. Brill. p. 802. doi:10.1163/1573-3912_islam_SIM_3205. OCLC 495469525.

Preceded by al-Nadr ibn Sa'id al-Harashi	Governor of Iraq; 745–749	Abbasid conquest
