= Asad ibn Kurz al-Bajali =

Companion of the Islamic prophet Muhammad

Asad ibn Kurz al-Bajali (أسد بن كرز البجلي) is primarily known for being a companion of the Islamic prophet Muhammad.

== Lineage ==
Asad was the son of Kurz ibn Amir ibn Abd Allah ibn Abd Shams ibn Gamgama ibn Jarir ibn Shiq ibn Sa'ab ibn Yashkur ibn Ruhm ibn Afrak ibn Afsa ibn Nadhir ibn Qasr ibn Abqar ibn Anmar al-Bajali

== Virtues ==
When Asad converted to Islam together with a person from Banu Thaqif, he presented an arc to Muhammad and then asked for and received his blessings.

== Hadith narrations ==
It is recorded that Asad narrated several hadiths, including the command to love and love others as we love ourselves and hadiths about disease fever that can abort sin sufferers.
