= Abd Allah ibn Mu'awiya =

Leader of an anti-Umayyad rebellion (died 747-8)

Abd Allah ibn Mu'awiya عبد الله بن معاوية
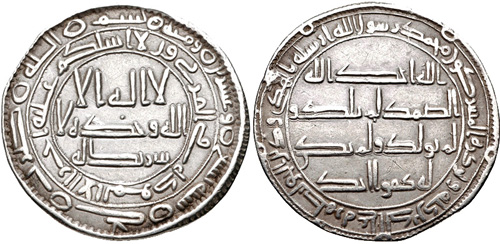
- Dirham of Abd Allah ibn Mu'awiya minted in Isfahan in c. 746–747

Ruler of Isfahan, Jibal, Ahvaz, Fars and Kerman
- In office 744–747
- Succeeded by: Amir ibn Dubara

Personal details
- Died: 130 AH (747 or 748 CE) Khurasan, Persia
- Parent: Mu'awiya ibn Abd Allah (father)
- Relatives: Abd Allah ibn Ja'far (grandfather); Ja'far ibn Abi Talib (great-grandfather)

Abd Allah ibn Mu'awiya ibn Abd Allah al-Hashimi (Arabic: عَبْدُ اللَّهِ بْنُ مُعَاوِيَةَ بْنُ عَبْدُ اللَّهِ الْهَاشِمِي, romanized: ʿAbd Allāh ibn Muʿāwiya ibn ʿAbd Allāh al-Hāshimī; died 747 or 748) was an Hashimi leader who started a rebellion against the Umayyad Caliphate at Kufa and later Persia during the Third Fitna.

== Early life and rise to the imamate ==
Abd Allah ibn Mu'awiya was a great-grandson of Ali's brother, Ja'far ibn Abi Talib. Following the death of Ali's grandson Abu Hashim in 703, the leadership of the Alid cause was vacant, and several candidates vied for it: one party claimed that Abu Hashim had transferred his rights to the Abbasid Muhammad ibn Ali, while another faction wanted to proclaim Abd Allah ibn Amr al-Kindi as the next imam. The latter, however, proved unsatisfactory, and Abd Allah ibn Mu'awiya was chosen instead.

Ibn Mu'awiya claimed not only the imamate, but also, according to Swedish orientalist Karl Vilhelm Zetterstéen, a divine status. Consequently, his followers embraced the concept of reincarnation and rejected the resurrection of the dead.

== Rebellion and death ==
In October 744, Ibn Mu'awiya and his followers rebelled in Kufa, and joined by other Alid sympathizers (especially Zaydis), took control of the city and expelled its governor. The reaction of the governor of Iraq, Abd Allah ibn Umar ibn Abd al-Aziz, however, was swift, and he marched on Kufa. Most of the citizens deserted the Alid cause, but the Zaydi contingent fought with enough determination to allow Ibn Mu'awiya to withdraw from Kufa, first to al-Mada'in and thence to Jibal.

Despite his defeat at Kufa, volunteers opposed to the Umayyad regime continued to flock to his banner, including remnants of the Kharijites defeated by Caliph Marwan II and some Abbasid followers. Taking advantage of the turmoils of the Third Fitna and the burgeoning Abbasid Revolution in Khurasan, which debilitated the Umayyad government, he managed to extend his control over large parts of Persia, including most of Jibal, Ahvaz, Fars and Kerman. He established his residence first at Isfahan and then at Istakhr. Capitalizing on this territorial expansion, he placed his family members in charge of core districts, appointing his brother Hasan as governor of Istakhr, Yazid over Shiraz, Ali over Kerman, and Salih over Qom and its surrounding districts.

Finally, Marwan II dispatched an army under Amir ibn Dubara against Ibn Mu'awiya. The Alid's forces were utterly defeated at Marw al-Shadhan in 747, and his rule over Persia collapsed. Ibn Mu'awiya himself managed to flee to Khurasan, where the Abbasid leader Abu Muslim executed him.

Some of his followers refused to believe his death, and believed that he would return as the mahdi, forming the sect known as the "Janahiyya". Others, the so-called "Harithites", believed that he was reincarnated in the person of Ishaq ibn Zayd ibn al-Harith al-Ansari.

== Bibliography ==
- Zetterstéen, K.V. (1987). "ʿAbd Allāh b. Muʿāwiya". In Houtsma, Martijn Theodoor (ed.). E.J. Brill's First Encyclopaedia of Islam, 1913–1936, Volume I: A–Bābā Beg. Leiden: BRILL. pp. 26–27. ISBN 90-04-08265-4.
- Sharon, Moshe (1990). Revolt: The Social and Military Aspects of the ʻAbbāsid Revolution: Black Banners from the East II. JSAI. ISBN 978-965-223-388-2.
