= List of Umayyad governors of Iraq =

This is a list of governors of the Umayyad province of Iraq.

== Overview ==
In medieval history, Iraq (Arabic: العراق al-ʿIrāq) was the area comprising the lower parts of Mesopotamia, being roughly equivalent in size and shape to the ancient region of Babylonia. It was bounded to the northwest by al-Jazira, to the north by Adharbayjan (the Sassanid Aturpatakan), to the northeast by al-Jibal, to the east by al-Ahwaz, to the southeast by the Sea of Fars (the Persian Gulf), and to the southwest by the desert of Arabia.

In the administrative structure of the Umayyad Caliphate, Iraq was at first not a unified province; rather, it was divided between the governors of the important garrison towns of Basra and Kufa. The two towns were united for the first time in 670 AD, when the caliph Mu'awiyah ibn Abi Sufyan gave control of both to Ziyad ibn Abihi. After Ziyad's death the two towns were again separately administered, but subsequent caliphs were to repeat the combination and from the reign of 'Abd al-Malik ibn Marwan on, Iraq was usually in the hands of a single governor.

The governor of Iraq was an extremely powerful individual within the administrative hierarchy of the Umayyad government. In addition to Iraq itself, he was frequently granted the responsibility for the provinces of the empire that had originally been conquered with Basran or Kufan troops, including al-Ahwaz, al-Jibal, Fars, Kerman, Khurasan, Sijistan, Makran, al-Sind, and Jurjan. He was furthermore given authority over the provinces of eastern Arabia, namely al-Bahrayn, al-Yamamah and Oman. In total, these provinces constituted almost half of the entire empire and produced a substantial amount of the revenues collected by the central government in Damascus. The governor had the power to appoint and dismiss sub-governors to each of these provinces, and each of his sub-governors reported directly to him, rather than to the caliph.

Governors who were appointed to Iraq all took up residence within the province during their tenure of office; the specific seat of government, however, tended to change over time. Under Ziyad ibn Abihi, Basra and Kufa served as twin capitals and he stayed at both towns during each year of his governorship. Basra subsequently edged out Kufa as the chief town of the province, and served as the seat of the governors for the remainder of the seventh century. The famous governor al-Hajjaj ibn Yusuf al-Thaqafi ordered the construction of a third garrison town, that of Wasit, which he then used as his residence for the remainder of his life. Thereafter, Wasit was often used by the governors as their primary residence, although they continued to sporadically move to other towns, such as Kufa and al-Hirah.

Iraq remained as an Umayyad province until the year 749/750, when an Abbasid army besieged Wasit and forced the last governor of Iraq, Yazid ibn Umar al-Fazari, to surrender. Following their victory over the Umayyads, the Abbasids abolished the governorship of Iraq and resumed the practice of appointing separate governors to the individual districts of the region.

== List of governors ==
Only governors that were in control of both Basra and Kufa at the same time appear in this list.

Name	Start	End	Nature of Termination	Notes
	661	670	n/a	Basra and Kufa were under separate governors during this period
Ziyad ibn Abihi	670	673	Died in office	Appointed by the caliph Muawiyah I
None	673	680	n/a	Basra and Kufa were under separate governors during this period
'Ubaydallah ibn Ziyad	680	684	Resigned	Son of Ziyad ibn Abihi. Appointed by the caliph Yazid ibn Mu'awiyah
None	684	691	n/a	Iraq was outside of Umayyad control for most of the second fitna. From 686 to 691, the Zubayrid Mus'ab ibn al-Zubayr was in control of Basra and Kufa.
None	691	693	n/a	Basra and Kufa were under separate governors during this period
Bishr ibn Marwan	693	694	Died in office	Brother of the caliph 'Abd al-Malik ibn Marwan, who appointed him
Al-Hajjaj ibn Yusuf al-Thaqafi	694	714	Died in office	Appointed by 'Abd al-Malik ibn Marwan
Yazid ibn Abi Kabshah al-Saksaki	714	715	Dismissed	Appointed by the caliph al-Walid ibn 'Abd al-Malik
Yazid ibn al-Muhallab al-Azdi and Salih ibn Abd al-Rahman	715	717	Dismissed	Yazid was appointed governor for military and religious affairs and Salih was appointed governor in fiscal affairs by the caliph Sulayman ibn 'Abd al-Malik
None	717	720	n/a	Basra and Kufa were under separate governors during this period
Maslama ibn 'Abd al-Malik	720	721	Dismissed	Brother of the caliph Yazid ibn 'Abd al-Malik, who appointed him
'Umar ibn Hubayra al-Fazari	721	724	Dismissed	Appointed by Yazid ibn 'Abd al-Malik
Khalid ibn 'Abdallah al-Qasri	724	738	Dismissed	Appointed by the caliph Hisham ibn 'Abd al-Malik
Yusuf ibn 'Umar al-Thaqafi	738	744	Dismissed	Appointed by Hisham ibn 'Abd al-Malik
Mansur ibn Jumhur al-Kalbi	744	744	Dismissed	Appointed by the caliph Yazid ibn al-Walid
'Abdallah ibn 'Umar	744	745	Dismissed	Son of the caliph 'Umar ibn 'Abd al-'Aziz. Appointed by Yazid ibn al-Walid
Al-Nadr ibn Sa'id al-Harashi	745	745	Resigned	Appointed by the caliph Marwan ibn Muhammad
Yazid ibn Umar al-Fazari	745	750	Killed	Son of 'Umar ibn Hubayra. Appointed by Marwan ibn Muhammad

== See also ==
- List of Umayyad governors of al-Andalus
- List of Umayyad governors of Arminiyah
- List of Umayyad governors of Egypt
- List of Umayyad governors of Ifriqiyah
- List of Umayyad governors of Madinah
- List of Umayyad governors of Sind
