= Al-Dahhak ibn Qays al-Shaybani =

Leader of Kharijite rebellion (died 746)

al-Ḍaḥḥāk ibn Qays al-Shaybānī الضحاك بن قيس الشيباني
- Died: 746
- Criminal charges: Rebellion against State (Treason)
- Penalty: Killed by Umayyad army

Al-Ḍaḥḥāk ibn Qays al-Shaybānī (Arabic: الضحاك بن قيس الشيباني) was the leader of a widespread but unsuccessful Kharijite rebellion in Iraq against the Umayyad Caliph Marwan II from 745 until his death in battle in 746.

== Crisis of the caliphate and the Kharijite revolt ==
The deposition of al-Walid II in spring 744 began a turbulent period in the Umayyad Caliphate; his successor Yazid III died within a few months, and the ambitious governor of Armenia and Azerbaijan Marwan ibn Muhammad, rebelled against Yazid's designated successor, Ibrahim ibn al-Walid. Marwan succeeded in gaining control of Damascus and Syria, but elsewhere his authority ranged from theoretical to non-existent.

In Iraq, this turmoil spilled over in the form of a struggle between Yazid III's governor Abdallah ibn Umar ibn Abd al-Aziz and Marwan's appointee, al-Nadr ibn Sa'id al-Harashi. This conflict allowed the Kharijites, a Muslim sect which had originated in Mesopotamia, to rise up. This revolt was initially led by Sa'id ibn Bahdal, but he died soon of the plague, and was succeeded by Dahhak. Dahhak quickly assembled a sizeable army, and managed to defeat the two rival governors, who had joined forces, in April/May 745. In the aftermath of their defeat, al-Harashi returned to Marwan and Abdallah ibn Umar retreated to the fortress of Wasit, where he was soon besieged. In August however Ibn Umar gave himself up, and, in an unprecedented act for a member of the Umayyad dynasty and of the Prophet's own Quraysh tribe, did homage to Dahhak, who was neither and who had by now been declared caliph by his followers. Kufa was now occupied by Dahhak's forces and became his seat, while Ibn Umar was named governor of Wasit, eastern Iraq and western Persia. Dahhak's generosity in rewarding his followers, as well as the attractiveness of Kharijite doctrine quickly swelled his ranks further, until his army is said to have reached 120,000 men. Among others, the famed general Sulayman, a son of Caliph Hisham ibn Abd al-Malik and opponent of Marwan, sought refuge with him.

== End of the rebellion ==
While Marwan was preoccupied with besieging Sulayman's brother Sa'id and his supporters in Homs, Dahhak marched into northern Mesopotamia. After he took Mosul, Marwan ordered his own son Abdallah, who resided at Harran, to confront the Kharijites' advance. Abdallah however was defeated and retreated to Nisibis, where he was besieged. After Homs fell however, Marwan with his army moved swiftly east. The two armies met at al-Ghazz in Kafartuta in August/September 746, and Dahhak's forces were decisively defeated, with Dahhak himself falling early in the battle. His successor, al-Khaybari, tried to renew the attack, but was also killed. The Kharijite rebellion persisted, under Abu Dulaf, for another year, but by the end of 747, Mesopotamia, Iraq and Persia had been secured by Marwan.

== Bibliography ==
- Hawting, Gerald R. (2000). The First Dynasty of Islam: The Umayyad Caliphate AD 661–750 (2nd ed.). Routledge. ISBN 0-415-24072-7.
- Veccia Vaglieri, Laura (1965). "al-Ḍaḥḥāk b. Qays al-Shaybānī". In Lewis, B.; Pellat, Ch. & Schacht, J. (eds.). The Encyclopaedia of Islam, Second Edition. Volume II: C–G. Leiden: E. J. Brill. p. 90. OCLC 495469475.
