= Wasit =

Ancient city in Iraq

- وَاسِط (Arabic)
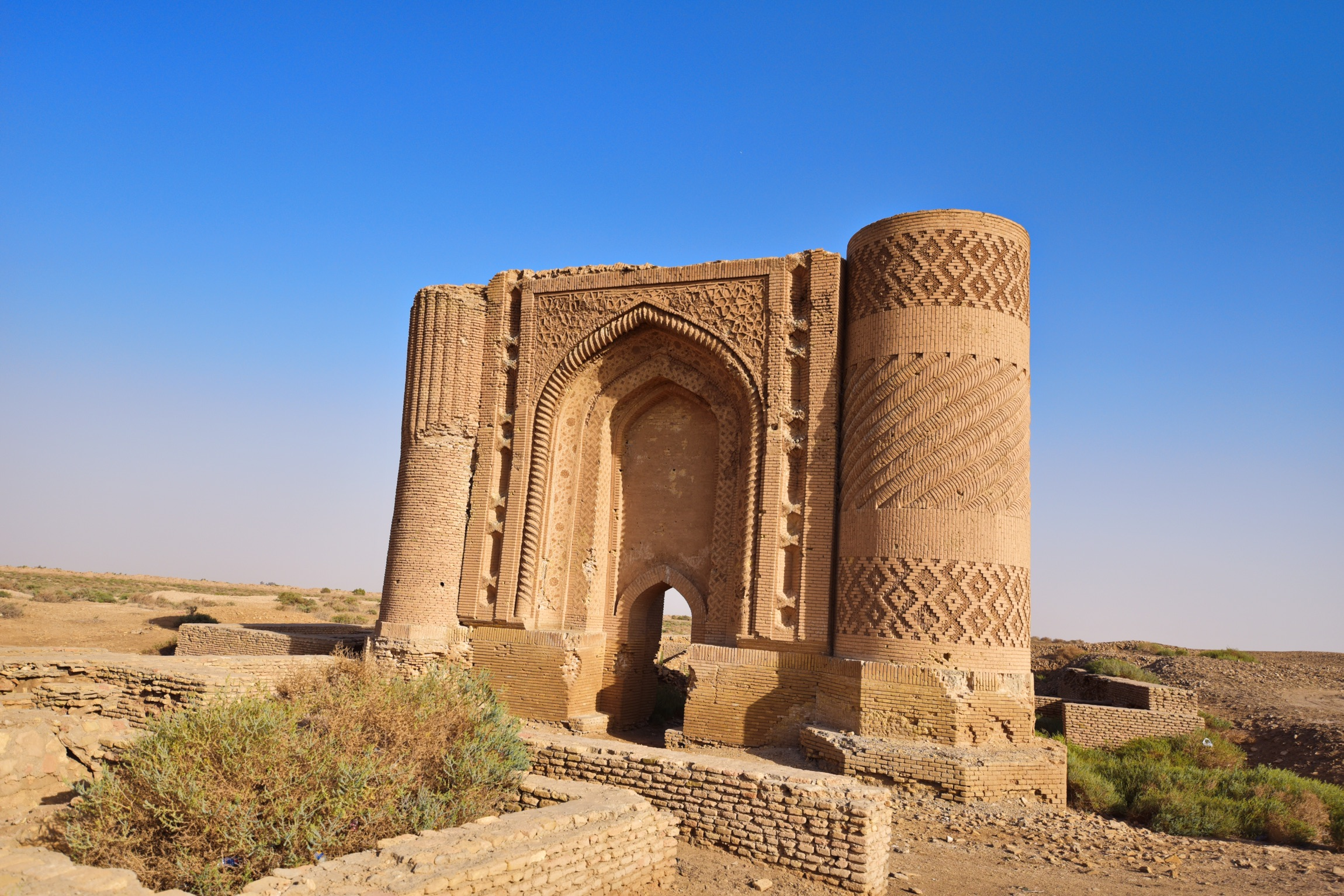
- Gate of Sharabai School in Wasit

- Location within Iraq
- 32.188°N 46.298°E
- Cultures: Islamic Caliphate (Islamic Golden Age)
- Location: Iraq
- Region: Wasit Governorate

Wasit (Arabic: وَاسِط, romanized: Wāsiṭ, Syriac: ܘܐܣܛ) was an early Islamic city in Iraq. It was founded in the 8th century by the Umayyad viceroy of Iraq, al-Hajjaj ibn Yusuf, to serve as the region's seat of power for the Umayyad governor and as the garrison of Umayyad troops to enforce Umayyad rule there. It was situated between the two traditional administrative centers and garrisons of Iraq, Kufa and Basra, hence its name Wasit (lit. 'middle'). The city was abandoned centuries later and its ruins are located in the eponymous Wasit Governorate, southeast of Kut in southeastern Iraq.

== History ==
The city was built by al-Hajjaj ibn Yusuf in c. 702 CE on the west bank of the Tigris across from the historical city of Kashkar. Al-Hajjaj is said to have taken the doors for the citadel and the main mosque from Zanzaward. Al-Hajjaj died in Wasit in 714.

To quote UNESCO:

Wasit is an Islamic city built in the last quarter of the first Hijri century (7th century CE) by Al-Hajaj bin Yousif Al-Thaqafi, as an administrative centre for Iraq. As an ancient city its circumference is 16 kilometres. It was abandoned in the tenth Hijri century (16th century CE), after the change in the course of the river Tigris. Its remains stood sound and safe due to its distance from constructive and agricultural influence. Most of its buildings are of bricks. A survey was carried out from 1936 to 1942, and another in 1985. The large mosque was cleared out in four stages from the seventh hijri, to the first hijri century, with some parts of its emirate house which is next to the mosque at the qibli side. A building known as the minaret was excavated, including a tomb and a school dating back to the seventh hijri century, a residence district was also cleared out in the late 1930s. Conservation has been carried out on some parts of the minaret due to the walls been worn out, but no real maintenance has been undertaken.

Ibn Battuta visited during his travels, noting "It has fine quarters and an abundance of orchards and fruit trees, and is famed for its notable men, the living teachers among whom furnish lessons for meditation." It was a garrison town, halfway between Kufa and Basra, hence its name.

== World Heritage status ==
This site was added to the UNESCO World Heritage Tentative List on September 7, 2000, in the Cultural category.
