= G. R. Hawting =

British historian and Islamicist (born 1944)

Gerald R. Hawting (born 1944) is a British historian specializing in Quranic studies and Islamic studies.

== Life ==
Hawting's teachers were Bernard Lewis and John Wansbrough. He received his Ph.D. in 1978. He is Emeritus Professor for the History of the Near and Middle East at the School of Oriental and African Studies (SOAS) in London.

== Research ==
In the line of John Wansbrough, Hawting concentrated on the question for the religious milieu in which Islam came into being. He analysed available sources about the religions on the Arabian Peninsula in the time before Islam in detail. According to Hawting, Islam did not develop within a world of polytheism as is reported by the traditional Islamic traditions which were written 150 to 200 years after Muhammad. Instead, Islam came into being on the basis of a conflict among various types of monotheists which considered each other to fail in living a perfect monotheism, and considering each other to practice idolatry.

Another theme of Hawting's research is the period of the Umayyad dynasty which was of great importance for the formation of Islam as a religion. Also Hawting's works are related with ibadism. Hawting is a representative of the Revisionist School of Islamic Studies.

== Works ==
- The First Dynasty of Islam: The Umayyad Caliphate AD 661-750 (1986)
- "John Wansbrough, Islam, and monotheism" (1997)
- The Idea of Idolatry and the Emergence of Islam: From Polemic to History (1999)

As editor and co-author:

- Approaches to the Quran (1993)
- The Development of Islamic Ritual (2006)

=== Works related to Ibadism ===
- Hawting, G.R.: (1978) The significance of the slogan Lā Ḥukma illā li'llāh and the references to the Ḥudūd in the Traditions about the Fitna and the murder of ʿUthmān. Bulletin of the School of Oriental and African Studies (London), vol. 41 (1978), 453–463
- Hawting, G.R., J.A. Mojaddedi, A. Samely: (eds.) (2000) Studies in Islamic and Middle Eastern texts and traditions in memory of Norman Calder (d. 1998). Oxford: Oxford University Press, 2000, Journal of Semitic Studies Supplement, 12
