= Marwan II =

Umayyad caliph from 744 to 750

Marwan II مروان بن محمد
- Amir al-Mu'minin
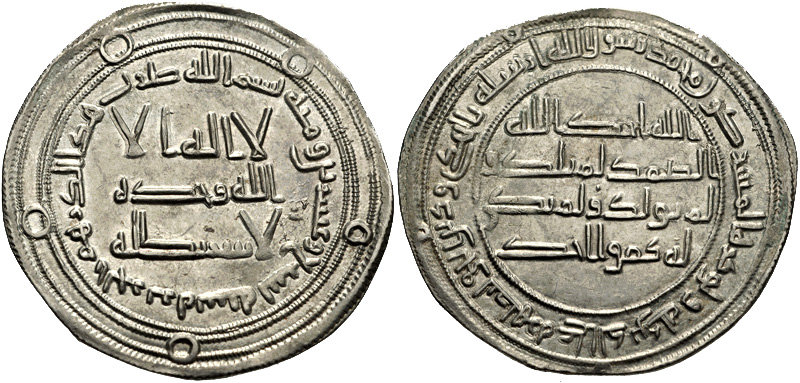
- Dirham of Marwan II

14th Caliph of the Umayyad Caliphate
- Reign: 4 December 744 – 6 August 750
- Predecessor: Ibrahim ibn al-Walid
- Successor: Position abolished al-Saffah (as Abbasid caliph)
- Born: c. 695; Al-Sham, Umayyad Caliphate (present-day Syria)
- Died: 6 August 750 CE (aged c. 55-56); Egypt, Umayyad Caliphate
- Spouse: Muznah
- Issue: Muhammad; Ubaydallah; Abd al-Malik; Abdallah
- House: Marwanid
- Dynasty: Umayyad
- Father: Muhammad ibn Marwan
- Mother: Umm Marwan (Umm walad)
- Religion: Islam

Marwan ibn Muhammad ibn Marwan (Arabic: مروان بن محمد بن مروان, romanized: Marwān ibn Muḥammad ibn Marwān; c. 691– 6 August 750), commonly known as Marwan II, was the fourteenth and last caliph of the Umayyad Caliphate, ruling from 744 until his death. His reign was dominated by a civil war, and he was the last Umayyad ruler to rule the united Caliphate before the Abbasid Revolution toppled the Umayyad dynasty.

== Birth and background ==
Marwan ibn Muhammad was a member of the Marwanid house of the Umayyad Caliphate. He was the son of Muhammad ibn Marwan, making him a grandson of the fourth Umayyad caliph Marwan I and a nephew to the caliph Abd al-Malik ibn Marwan and a cousin to Yazid II, the father of al-Walid II. Historical tradition places his birth around 695 CE.

Political opponents weaponized his maternal lineage and non-Arab background to undermine his legitimacy during the civil wars of the Third Fitna. Hostile accounts claimed his mother was a non-Arab concubine of Kurdish origin who was already pregnant when Muhammad ibn Marwan acquired her following the suppression of anti-Umayyad rebels during the Second Fitna in Iraq, leading detractors to attribute his paternity to alternative figures. Such genealogical attacks reflected broader anxieties among the Umayyad elite regarding the political rise of slave-born heirs during the twilight of the dynasty.

== Early life ==
In 732–733, Caliph Hisham appointed Marwan governor of Armenia. In 735–736, Marwan invaded Georgia, devastated it and then took three fortresses of the Alans and made peace with Tumanshah. In 739–740, he launched further raids and obtained tribute.

In 744–745, on hearing news of the plot to overthrow al-Walid II, Marwan wrote to his relatives from Armenia strongly discouraging this. He urged them to harmoniously preserve the stability and well-being of the Umayyad house, however, this was disregarded and many armed men moved into Damascus. Yazid slipped into Damascus and deposed al-Walid in a coup, following this up with a disbursement of funds from the treasury. Following al-Walid's assassination, Sulayman ibn Hisham, who had previously been imprisoned by al-Walid, was released in Transjordan, secured the local provincial treasury, and marched toward Damascus to consolidate his position with the new regime.

Reportedly, Marwan II, who for several years had supervised the campaigns against the Byzantines and the Khazars on the Caliphate's northwestern frontiers, had considered claiming the caliphate at the death of al-Walid II, but a Kalbi rebellion had forced him to wait. Instead, Yazid III appointed him governor to Upper Mesopotamia and he took up residence in the Qays-dominated city of Harran. Throughout Yazid III's Caliphate Marwan remained a governor and he didn't claim the throne for himself.

== Reign ==
When Yazid III persisted in overthrowing al-Walid II, Marwan at first opposed him, then rendered allegiance to him. On Yazid's early death (Yazid named his brother Ibrahim ibn al-Walid as his successor. Yazid fell ill of a brain tumour), Marwan renewed his ambitions, ignored Yazid's named successor Ibrahim, and became caliph. Ibrahim initially hid, then requested Marwan give him assurances of personal safety. This, Marwan granted and Ibrahim even accompanied the new Caliph to Hisham's residence of Rusafah.

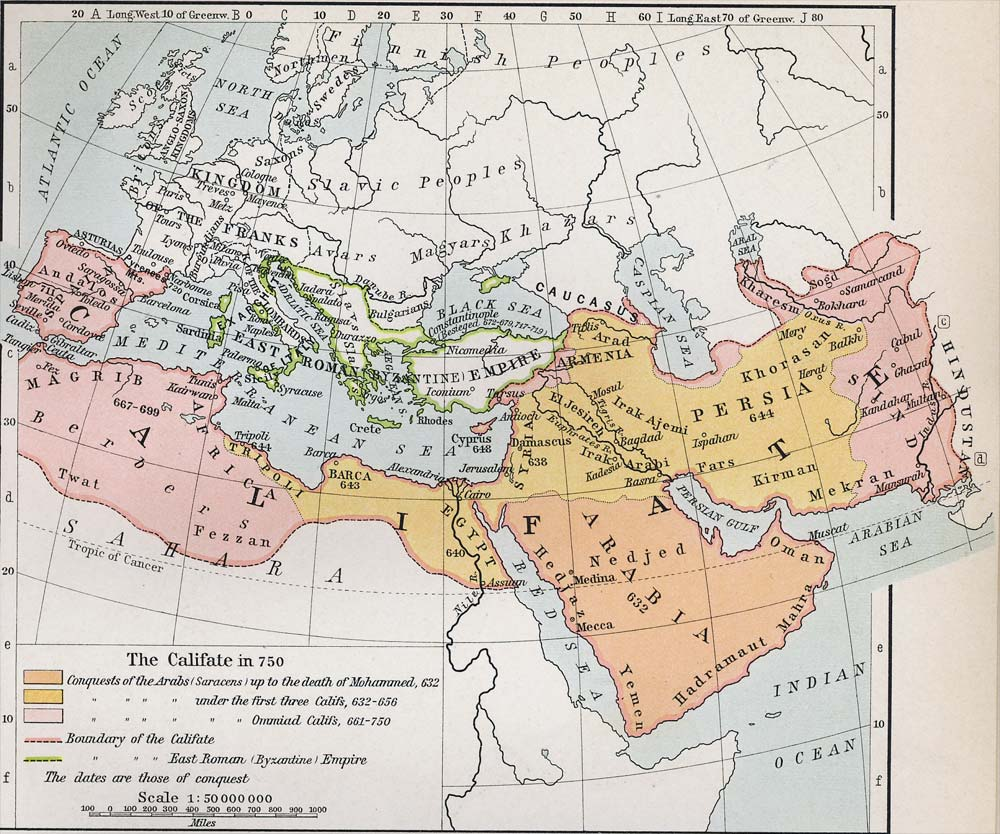
The expansion of the Muslim Caliphate until 750, from William R. Shepherd's Historical Atlas. Muslim state at the death of Muhammad Expansion under the Rashidun Caliphate Expansion under the Umayyad Caliphate Byzantine Empire

Marwan named his two sons Ubaydallah and Abdullah heirs. He appointed governors and proceeded to assert his authority by force. However, the anti-Umayyad feeling was very prevalent, especially in Iran and Iraq. The Abbasids had gained much support. As such, Marwan's reign as caliph was almost entirely devoted to trying to keep the Umayyad empire together.

Marwan took Emesa (Homs) after a bitter ten-month siege. Al-Dahhak ibn Qays al-Shaybani led a Kharijite rebellion. He defeated the Syrian forces and took Kufa. Sulayman ibn Hisham turned against Marwan, but suffered a severe defeat. The Kharijites advanced on Mosul and were defeated. Sulayman joined them. Al-Dahhak's successor al-Khaybari was initially successful in pushing back Marwan's center and even took the caliph's camp and sat on his carpet. However, he and those with him fell into fighting in the camp. Shayban succeeded him. Marwan pursued him and Sulayman to Mosul and besieged them there for six months. Then, reinforced, the caliph drove them out. Shayban fled to Bahrayn where he was killed; Sulayman sailed to India.

In Khurasan there was internal discord, with the Umayyad governor Nasr ibn Sayyar facing opposition from al-Harith and al-Kirmani. They also fought each other. In addition, Abbasid envoys arrived. There had long been religious fervor and a kind of messianic expectation of Abbasid ascendency. During Ramadan of 747 (16 May – 14 June), the Abbasids unfurled the standards of their revolt. Nasr sent his retainer Yazid against them. Yazid, however, was bested, taken, and held captive. He was impressed by the Abbasids and when released told Nasr he wanted to join them, but his obligations to Nasr brought him back.

Fighting continued throughout Khurasan with the Abbasids gaining increasing ascendency. Finally, Nasr fell sick and died at Rayy on 9 November 748 at the age of eighty-five.

Marwan campaigned in Egypt in 749 to quell the Bashmuric Revolt and secure his rear, but his campaign was a failure. The Abbasids, meanwhile, achieved success in the Hijaz. Marwan suffered a decisive defeat by Abu al-Abbas al-Saffah on the banks of the Great Zab, called Battle of the Zab. At this battle alone, over 300 members of the Umayyad family died. Marwan fled, leaving Damascus, Jordan and Palestine and reaching Egypt, where he was caught and killed on 6 August 750. His heirs Ubaydallah and Abdallah escaped to modern Eritrea. Abdallah died in fighting there.

Marwan's death signaled the end of Umayyad fortunes in the East and was followed by the mass killing of Umayyads by the Abbasids. Almost the entire Umayyad dynasty was killed, except for the prince Abd al-Rahman ibn Mu'awiya who escaped to Spain and founded an Umayyad dynasty there. In Egypt, Marwan's tongue was fed to a cat.

== Bibliography ==
- Gabra, Gawdat (2003). "The Revolts of the Bashmuric Copts in the Eighth and Ninth Centuries". In W. Beltz (ed.). Die koptische Kirche in den ersten drei islamischen Jahrhunderten. Institut für Orientalistik, Martin-Luther-Universität. pp. 111–119. Archived from the original on 22 March 2020.
- Hillenbrand, Carole, ed. (1989). The History of al-Ṭabarī, Volume XXVI: The Waning of the Umayyad Caliphate: Prelude to Revolution, A.D. 738–744/A.H. 121–126. SUNY Series in Near Eastern Studies. Albany, New York: State University of New York Press. ISBN 978-0-88706-810-2.
- Hain, Kathryn A.; Gordon, Matthew (2017). Concubines and Courtesans: Women and Slavery in Islamic History. Oxford University Press. ISBN 978-0-19062-218-3.
- Hawting, Gerald R. (2000). The First Dynasty of Islam: The Umayyad Caliphate AD 661–750 (Second ed.). London and New York: Routledge. ISBN 0-415-24072-7.
- Rowson, Everett K., ed. (1989). The History of al-Ṭabarī, Volume XXII: The Marwānid Restoration: The Caliphate of ʿAbd al-Malik, A.D. 693–701/A.H. 74–81. SUNY Series in Near Eastern Studies. Albany, New York: State University of New York Press. ISBN 978-0-88706-975-8.
- Bobrick, Benson (2012). The Caliph's Splendor: Islam and the West in the Golden Age of Baghdad. Simon & Schuster. ISBN 978-1416567622.
- Gaiser, Adam R. (2022). Sectarianism in Islam: The Umma Divided. Cambridge University Press. ISBN 978-1-009-32505-9.
- Arjomand, Said Amir (2025). Messianism and Sociopolitical Revolution in Medieval Islam. University of California Press. ISBN 978-0-520-42516-3.

Marwan II Umayyad dynasty Born: 691 Died: 6 August 750
Sunni Islam titles
Preceded by Ibrahim ibn al-Walid	Last Caliph of the Umayyad Caliphate; Caliph of Islam; Umayyad Caliph; 744 – 6 August 750	Succeeded by As-Saffah
Regnal titles
Preceded by Ibrahim ibn al-Walid as Caliph	Leader of the Umayyad Dynasty; 744 – 6 August 750	Succeeded by Abd ar-Rahman I as Emir of Córdoba
