= Marwan =

Name list

Mrwan/Marwan/Marouane/Marwan
- Pronunciation: Arabic: [marˈwaːn]
- Gender: Male

Origin
- Language: Arabic
- Meaning: 'Solid stone' from maruww ('flint') used to make fire in ancient times 'Strong lion' 'Leader'

Marwan, Merwan or Marwen or Mervan (Arabic: مروان, romanized: Marwān) is an Arabic male given name derived from the word maruww (مرو) with the meaning of either minerals, 'flint(-stone)', 'quartz"' or 'hard stone of nearly pure silica'. However, the Arabic name for quartz is ṣawwān (صَوَّان). The name is very common in the Arab world particularly in the Levant, and is widely used by Arab Christians and Muslims alike.

The name is also the name of a type of genus of the herbal plant basil.

Variants include Merouane, Marouane and Marouan (influenced by French spelling). Feminine forms of the name include Marwa or Marwah and Marwana or Marwanah (مروانة, Marwānah).

Notable persons with these names include:

== Given name ==
=== Marwan ===
- Marwan I, Umayyad caliph (r. 684–685)
- Marwan II, Umayyad caliph (r. 744–750)
- Marwan ibn Abi Hafsa (d. 797), Abbasid-era poet
- Marwan ibn Abi al-Janub, 9th century Abbasid poet
- Marwan Abou Fadel, Lebanese Christian politician
- Marwan (rapper), Danish-Palestinian rapper Mohamed Marwan
- Marwan Abdelhamid (born 2000), known as Saint Levant, Palestinian singer-songwriter and rapper
- Marwan Ali, Tunisian pop singer
- Marwan Barghouti, leader of the Palestinian group Fatah
- Marwan Charbel, Lebanese general and politician
- Marwan Dudin (1936–2016), Jordanian politician
- Marwan Hamadeh, Lebanese politician
- Marwan Hamed, Egyptian film director
- Marwan Kassab-Bachi (1934–2016), German painter of Syrian origin
- Marwan Kenzari, Dutch Tunisian actor
- Marwan Khoury, Lebanese artist
- Marwan al-Muasher, Jordanian politician
- Marwan al-Shehhi (1978–2001), Emirati terrorist and 9/11 hijacker
- Marwan Elubi, Yazidi Qewl Singer

=== Merwan ===
- Meher Baba, (1894–1969), Indian spiritual leader born Merwan Sheriar Irani
- Merwan Rim, French actor and singer-songwriter
- Merwan ha-Levi, 11th-century philanthropist of Narbonne

== Surname ==
- Ashraf Marwan (1944–2007), Egyptian businessman

== Tribal groups ==
- Banu Marwan ibn Wada'a, a clan of the Juhaynah tribe of Banu ‘Akk

== Ibn / Bint / Abu ==
- Abd al-Malik ibn Marwan (r. 685–705) was the Umayyad caliph of the Arab Caliphate
- Abd al-Aziz ibn Marwan Caliphal governor of Egypt for 685 to 705
- Bishr ibn Marwan, Umayyad provincial governor.
- Aban ibn Marwan, Governor of Palestine under Umayyad caliph Abd al-Malik
- Ubayd Allah ibn Marwan Army commander
- Muhammad ibn Marwan, son of caliph Marwan I, Governor of Caliphal province of Armenia and Father of Marwan II
- Asma bint Marwan, a medieval Arabian female poet (7th century)
- Ibn Marwan, chieftain in the Al-Andalus (9th century)
- Ubayd Allah Abu Marwan, general in the Al-Andalus (8th/9th century)

== Fictional characters ==
- Habib Marwan, in the TV drama 24
- Nawal Marwan, in the 2010 film Incendies

== See also ==
- Marwanids (990–1085), Kurdish dynasty
- Banu Marwan, Umayyad Arab clan
