= Merouane =

Marouane, Merouane or variations thereof is a masculine given name and surname of Arabic origin. Notable people with the name include:

== Given name ==
=== Marouane ===
- Marouane Bokri (born 1974), Tunisian footballer
- Marouane Braiek (born 1985), Tunisian retired football goalkeeper
- Marouane Chamakh (born 1984), Moroccan-French footballer
- Marouane Fakhr (born 1989), Moroccan football goalkeeper
- Marouane Fehri (born 1979), Tunisian former volleyball player
- Marouane Fellaini (born 1987), Belgian footballer
- Marouane Hadhoudi (born 1992), Moroccan footballer
- Marouane Louadni (born 1995), Moroccan footballer
- Marouane M'rabet (born 1985), Tunisian volleyball player
- Marouane Sahraoui (born 1996), French-born Tunisian footballer
- Marouane Soussi (born 1988), Tunisian handball player
- Marouane Troudi (born 1990), Tunisian retired footballer
- Marouane Zila (born 1997), Moroccan footballer

=== Merouane ===
- Merouane Abdouni (born 1981), Algerian retired football goalkeeper
- Merouane Anane (born 1990), Algerian footballer
- Merouane Dahar (born 1992), Algerian footballer
- Merouane Guerouabi (born 1989), Algerian actor and comedian
- Merouane Kial (born 1972), Algerian footballer
- Merouane Zemmama (born 1983), Moroccan football manager and former player
- Merouane Zerrouki (born 2001), Algerian footballer

=== Other ===
- Marouan Azarkan (born 2001), Dutch footballer
- Marouan Chouiref (born 1990), Tunisian handball player
- Marouene Guezmir (born 1974), Tunisian footballer
- Marouan Kechrid (born 1981), Tunisian-French basketball player
- Marouan Laghnej (born 1986), Tunisian basketball player
- Marouen Lahmar (born 1982), Tunisian basketball player
- Marouen Maggaiz (born 1983), Tunisian handball goalkeeper
- Marouan Razine (born 1991), Moroccan-born Italian long-distance runner
- Marouan Toutouh (born 1994), Moroccan-Dutch kickboxer

== Surname ==
- Fatima Marouan (born 1952), also spelled Fatema Marouane, Moroccan physician, business executive and politician
- Leïla Marouane (born Leyla Zineb Mechentel; 1960–2026), Tunisian-born French Algerian journalist and creative writer

== See also ==
- Marwan
