= Khirbet el-Khalde =

Archaeological site in Aqaba, Jordan

Coordinates: 29.6567°N 35.2307°E

- Interactive map of Khirbet el-Khalde
- Type: fort (castellum), caravanserai (possible), cemetery, aqueduct, watchtowers
- Periods: Nabataean, Roman and Byzantine periods (main phases); Iron Age, middle Islamic-era (limited settlement)
- Location: Aqaba Governorate, Jordan

Khirbet el-Khalde is an archaeological site located in southern Jordan. It features the remains of an ancient castellum (fort) alongside a second building often identified as a caravanserai. Evidence points to occupation mainly from the Nabataean period through the Late Byzantine period, with traces of earlier Iron Age and later Islamic-era activity. The site was first systematically surveyed in 2023, helping to clarify its layout and chronology, while also documenting significant damage caused by modern infrastructure works, recent archaeological looting, and erosion caused by seasonal flooding in Wadi al-Yutm.

== Geography ==
Khirbet el-Khalde is situated approximately 26 kilometers northwest of Aqaba (ancient Ayla), within the Wadi al-Yutm, a corridor that connects the Red Sea with inland regions of southern Jordan. It is located alongside the course of Via Traiana Nova, an imperial Roman road. Two hills flank the site, and a mountain with a spring is nearby.

== Archaeology ==
The most prominent remains at the site consist of two rectangular architectural complexes. The larger of these is a fortified structure, or castellum, characterized by four corner towers and an entrance along its northeastern side. Internally, the building is organized around two open areas separated by a wall, with rooms lining the perimeter walls. The center of the larger courtyard features a cistern.

Southwest of the castellum stands a second rectangular building, frequently identified (though not conclusively) as a caravanserai. It features a central courtyard with surrounding rooms. Beyond these two main complexes, the site includes additional features such as a c. 1-kilometer-long aqueduct channel and basin, two watchtowers positioned on the surrounding hills, and multiple rock-cut cisterns. A burial area is located 250 meters northeast of the castellum, many of the graves have been damaged by looting.

The material evidence from the site points to a long occupational history; the site appears to be used from the Nabataean period through the Late Byzantine period. This dating is supported by pottery and glass finds, coins, inscriptions and masonry blocks worked in a Nabataean style. Some of the finds also hint at earlier activity during the Iron Age and later reuse in the Middle Islamic period, though these phases are currently less well documented.

== Research history ==
Until the 2020s, the site had received little scholarly attention. Early references were limited to brief documentation by travelers or scholars, without substantial fieldwork. In 2023, a survey campaign was carried out by a multinational team from Aarhus University, the University of Alberta, and the University of Milan. The project focused on non-invasive methods designed to clarify the extent, character and chronology of occupation across the site. The team conducted architectural recording, surface collection in key areas and drone-based aerial photography, and also analyzed historical satellite imagery.

== Condition ==
Modern activity has damaged the site substantially; the construction of a railway branch of the Hejaz Railway in the early 20th century destroyed one of the fort's towers. More recently, transmission lines and service roads have also affected the site, especially parts of the aqueduct. The site has also been affected by natural flooding and extensive archaeological looting.

== See also ==
- Udhruh

== Bibliography ==
=== Sources ===
- Harvey, Craig A.; Intagliata, Emanuele E.; Raja, Rubina (2024). "Khirbet al-Khalde — A Road Station in the Wadi al-Yutm". Archaeology in Jordan. 4. American Center of Research (ACOR): 173–175.
- Harvey, Craig A.; Intagliata, Emanuele E.; Mokranova, Katarina; Raja, Rubina (2024). "Cultural Heritage Damage Assessment at Khirbet al-Khalde in a Longue Durée Perspective: Multiscalar Methodologies and Survey Results" (PDF). Journal of Eastern Mediterranean Archaeology and Heritage Studies. 12 (2): 172–195.
