= Ubayd Allah ibn Marwan =

Umayyad Prince and Commander

Governor of the Balqa
- Monarch: Abd al-Malik

Personal details
- Parents: Marwan I (father); Umm Aban al-Kubra bint Uthman ibn Affan (mother)
- Military career
- Relatives: Abd al-Malik (brother); Al-Walid I (nephew); Aban (brother)
- Allegiance: Umayyad Caliphate
- Rank: Commander
- Conflicts: Arab–Byzantine wars

ʿUbayd Allāh ibn Marwān ibn al-Ḥakam (Arabic: عبيد الله بن مروان بن الحكم) was an Umayyad prince and commander. He was the son of the Umayyad caliph Marwan I (r. 684–685) and the latter's wife Umm Aban al-Kubra, a daughter of Caliph Uthman (r. 644–656).

Ubayd Allah's half-brother Caliph Abd al-Malik (r. 685–705) appointed him as one of the commanders of the near-annual raids against the Byzantine frontier with the Umayyad Caliphate. Abd al-Malik also appointed Ubayd Allah, for an unclear period, the governor of the Balqa, a subdistrict of the Damascus district spanning the area between Syria and Wadi al-Qura (in northwestern Arabia). Ubayd Allah's full brothers Aban and Uthman also held command roles under Abd al-Malik.

== Bibliography ==
- Ahmed, Asad Q. (2010). The Religious Elite of the Early Islamic Ḥijāz: Five Prosopographical Case Studies. Oxford: University of Oxford Linacre College Unit for Prosopographical Research. ISBN 978-1-900934-13-8.
- Donner, Fred M. (2014). "Was Marwan ibn al-Hakam the First 'Real' Muslim". In Savant, Sarah Bowen; de Felipe, Helena (eds.). Genealogy and Knowledge in Muslim Societies: Understanding the Past. Edinburgh: Edinburgh University Press. pp. 105–114. ISBN 978-0-7486-4497-1.
