= Marwan ibn Abi Hafsa =

Abbasid-era Arab poet

- مروان بن أبي حفصة
- Born: 723 al-Yamama, Umayyad Caliphate
- Died: c. 797/8; Baghdad, Abbasid Caliphate
- Occupation: Poet
- Writing career
- Language: Arabic
- Period: Umayyad and Abbasid eras
- Genre: Poetry
- Notable work: Panegyrics

Abu'l-Simt Marwan al-Akbar ibn Sulayman ibn Yahya ibn Abi Hafsa (Arabic: مروان بن أبي حفصة) (723–c. 797/8) was a famous Arabic poet at the court of the Abbasid Caliphate during the second half of the 8th century. He was born to a non-Arab family.

== Biography ==
Marwan belonged to what the 11th-century anthologist al-Tha'alibi called "the most poetic of families in Islam", as it counted six poets. This tradition began with the eponymous ancestor, Marwan's great-grandfather, Abu Hafsa Yazid. He was either of Persian or Jewish origin and a mawla of the Umayyad caliph Marwan I.

Marwan was born in al-Yamama in 723. In order to pursue his career, Marwan left his family's home for Baghdad, where he quickly rose to prominence in the court circles. Marwan knew to take advantage of his position and manage his image: the specialist of Arab poetry Jamel Eddine Bencheikh describes him as "sordidly avaricious, clumsy and unscrupulous, he would arrive at the palace clad in rags, despite the enormous sums which the caliphs gave him for his poems. With a keen eye to his own advancement, he attached himself to the prominent Arab chief Ma'n ibn Za'ida. He wrote numerous works in praise of his patron, of such skill and eloquence that on one occasion the Abbasid caliphs al-Mansur (r. 754–775) and al-Mahdi (r. 775–785) are said to have taken offence at the lavish praise, and to have excluded him from their presence for one year thereafter. Nevertheless he always returned to favour, not least because he shared his family's hostility to the Alids and was a staunch propagandist of the Abbasids' legitimacy. He was assassinated in c. 797/8 under unclear circumstances. The story that his assassin was an Alid supporter angry about his attacks on their claims to the caliphate may be apocryphal, but as the historian H. Kilpatrick notes, it nevertheless "suggests the impact that his poetry had".

His brother Idris also wrote poetry, but it was Marwan's grandson, Marwan ibn Abi al-Janub, who was the last notable poet of the family.

== Assessment ==
Bencheikh considers Marwan "a great classical poet" and "a master of the well-turned utterance", with a "supple and lexically straightforward vocabulary" and "clear syntax" that lent themselves to striking formulations in his panegyrics. According to H. Kilpatrick, he was "a master of the classical style associated with the great Umayyad panegyrists".

He was meticulous in the composition and preparation of his poems, first showing them to grammarians to improve his language. Indeed, his knowledge of Arabic was deficient; the strict philologist al-Asma'i (d. 828/833) scorned him as a half-Arab (muwallad) who never properly learned the language, and anecdotes tell of his giving incorrect explanations of words. At the same time, this was typical of the poets of his time, and did not prevent other philologists from praising his work: Ibn al-A'rabi (d. 846) considered him the last of the great poets. The bulk of his work is panegyric or elegiac in nature, but a few compositions on private, everyday affairs, have also survived.

== Sources ==
- Bencheikh, J.E. (1991). "Marwān al-Akbar b. Abī Ḥafṣa and Marwān al-Aṣg̲h̲ar b. Abi 'l-D̲j̲anūb". In Bosworth, C. E.; van Donzel, E. & Pellat, Ch. (eds.). The Encyclopaedia of Islam, Second Edition. Volume VI: Mahk–Mid. Leiden: E. J. Brill. pp. 625–626. doi:10.1163/1573-3912_islam_SIM_4981. ISBN 978-90-04-08112-3.
- Kilpatrick, H. (1998). "Marwān ibn Abī Ḥafṣa (105–c.182/723–c.798)". In Julie Scott Meisami; Paul Starkey (eds.). Encyclopedia of Arabic Literature. Vol. 2. Routledge. p. 511. ISBN 0-415-18572-6.
