= Balqa (region) =

Historical region in central Jordan

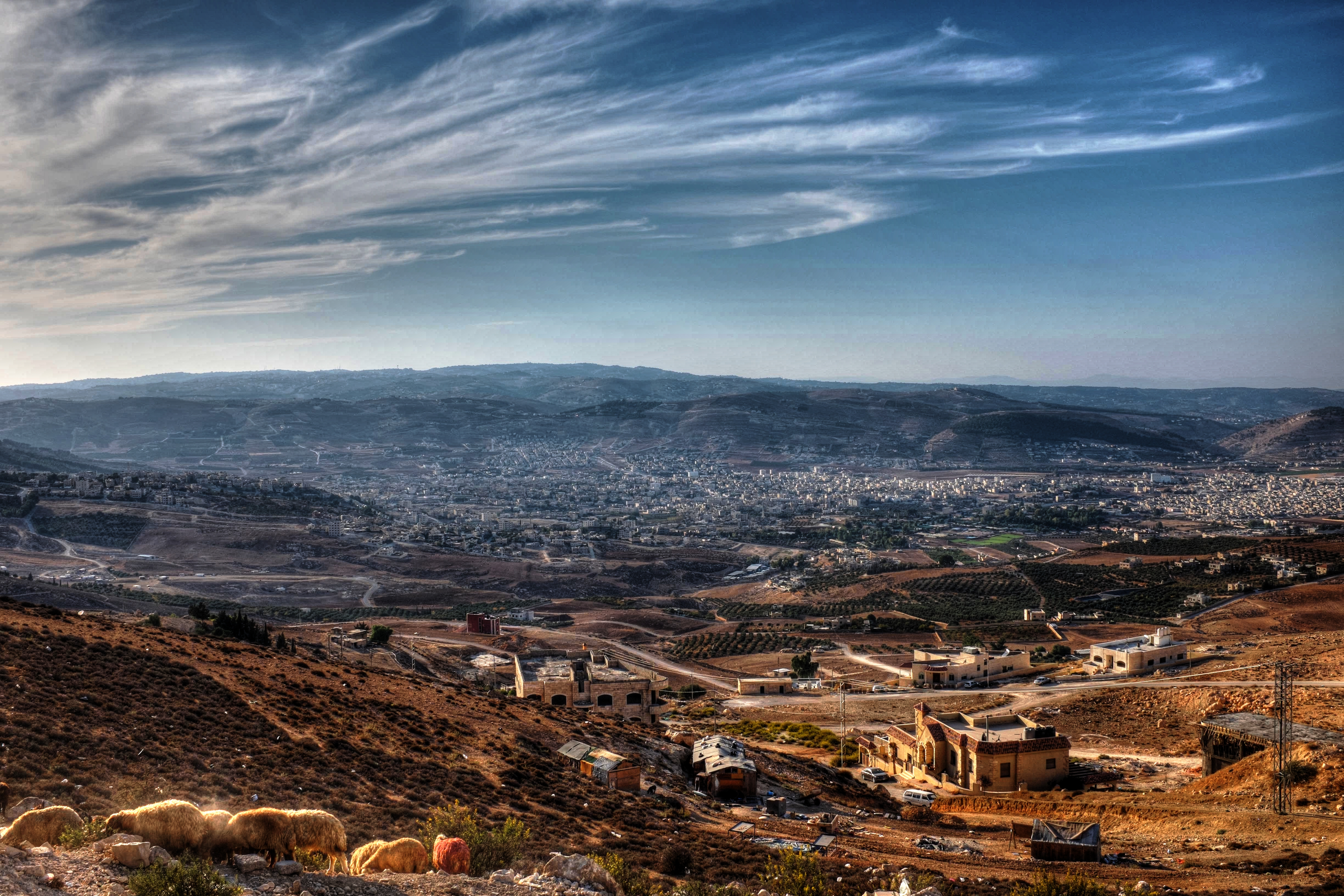
The landscape of the Balqa as seen from a hill in the Baqa'a suburb of Amman

The Balqa (Arabic: البلقاء; transliteration: al-Balqāʾ), known colloquially as the Balga, is a geographic region in central Jordan generally defined as the highlands east of the Jordan Valley in between the Zarqa River to the north and the Wadi Mujib gorge to the south.

The Balqa was part of the Byzantine province of Arabia Petraea and home to the Arab tribes of Judham, Lakhm and Bali. After the 630s Muslim conquest, it became part of Jund Dimashq (the military district of Damascus). The Umayyad family maintained interests in the region before the founding of the Umayyad Caliphate (661–750), a period in which the Balqa prospered. Starting from the reign of Caliph Abd al-Malik (r. 685–705), the Balqa was assigned its own sub-governor. The caliphs Yazid II and his son al-Walid II lived in the Balqa as princes and caliphs, building several palatial residences. In the 10th century the Balqa became subordinate to Jund Filastin (the military district of Palestine). Under the Ayyubids (1170s–1260) and Mamluks (1260–1516) the Balqa continued to function as a district, subordinate to Damascus, sometimes spanning the Sharat highlands to the south.

Amman had been the Balqa's traditional capital, but the capital shifted to Hisban under the Mamluks. The tribes of Banu Sakhr and Banu Mahdi, descendants of the Judham, lived there at the time. By the 16th century, during Ottoman rule, only four villages were recorded in the Balqa, along with the Bedouin tribe of Da'aja, still present in the region. In the late 18th–early 19th centuries, the only permanent settlement was the mixed Muslim and Christian town of Salt, the rest of the region being dominated by Bedouin tribes, the strongest of which was the Adwan. The Balqa had been outside Ottoman government control until the campaign of Rashid Pasha in the late 1860s, after which it was incorporated into the Nablus Sanjak. In the following years several settlements were established or re-established, including Amman and Madaba, by Christians from Salt and Karak, government-sponsored Circassian and Chechen refugees, and Bedouin chiefs.

The growing prosperity of the Balqa in the late Ottoman period was disrupted by the British occupation of the region in World War I. The paramountcy of the Banu Sakhr over the Adwan and other local tribes was sealed in the subsequent period, leading to the Adwan Rebellion. Amman became the capital of the Emirate of Transjordan in 1923 and continues to be the capital of the Emirate's successor state, the Kingdom of Jordan. The region is presently divided between the governorates of Balqa (centered in Salt), Amman, Zarqa and Madaba. Mainly due to the influx of Palestinian refugees from the 1948 and 1967 Arab–Israeli wars, Palestinians and their descendants made up about 70% of the population of Amman, Zarqa and Balqa. Most of the preexisting population during the same period comprised the descendants of the formerly semi-nomadic Arab tribesmen of the Balqa, who continue to identify culturally as Bedouin.

== Etymology ==
According to J. Sourdel-Thomine, the Arabic etymology of al-Balqāʾ could be related to the feminine form of the Arabic word ablaq, meaning "variegated". The most popular etymology cited by the medieval Arabic geographers, however, was that Balqa was the name of a descendant of the Bani Amman ibn Lut, which conjures up the Ammonites and the biblical figure and Islamic prophet Lot.

== Geography ==
=== Geographic definition ===
The Balqa forms the central part of the Transjordanian highlands. It extends from the Zarqa River in the north to the Wadi Mujib gorge in the south. The southern limit of the Balqa is alternatively placed north of Wadi Mujib at Wadi Zarqa Ma'in, hence the colloquial description of the Balqa as "the land between the two Zarqas". The Zarqa River separates the Balqa from the Jabal Ajlun highlands, while the Wadi Mujib separates it from the Sharat highlands. To the west, the Balqa borders the lowlands of the Jordan Valley (called al-Ghor in Arabic), while the region borders the Syrian Desert in the east.

=== Topography and climate ===
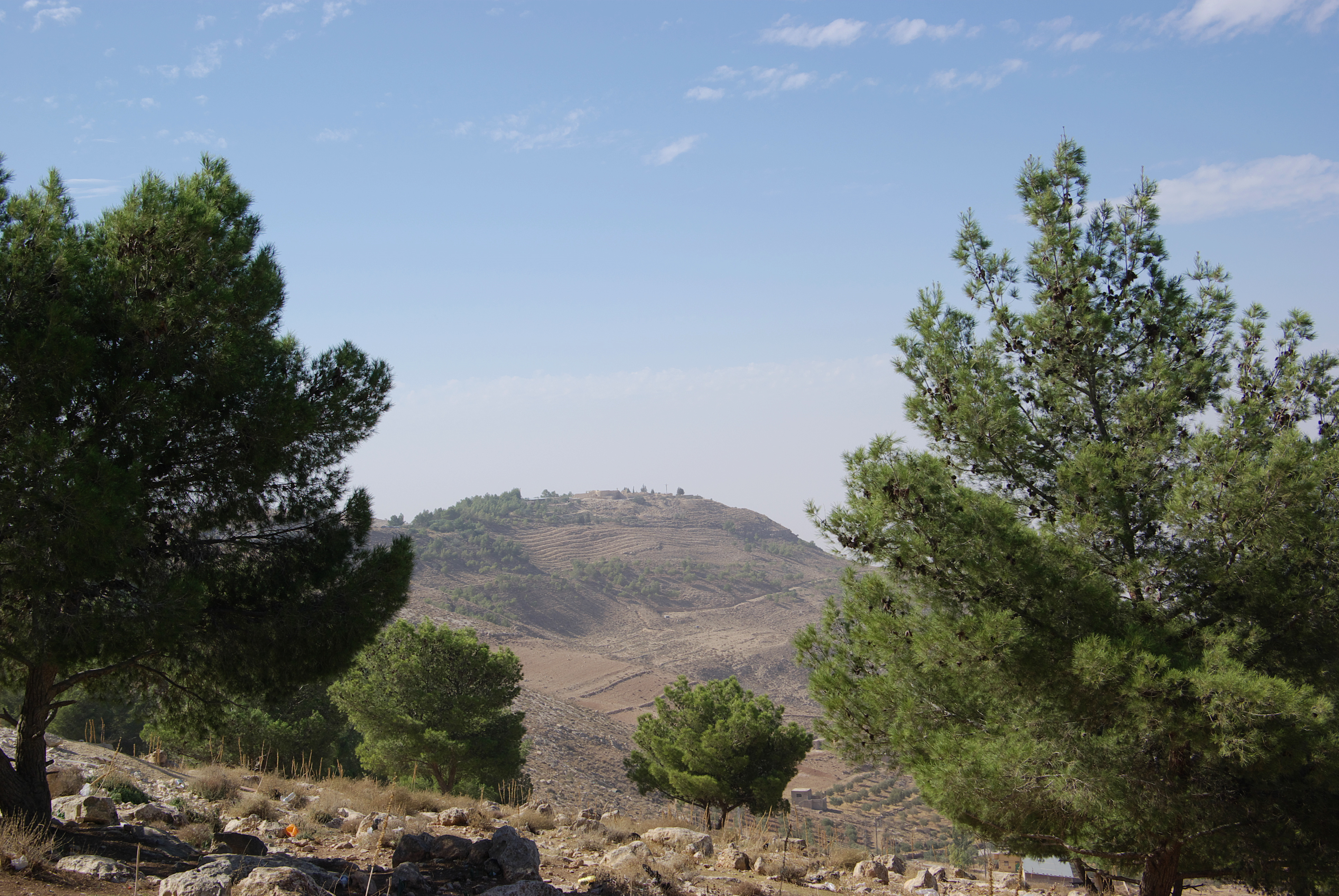
Mount Nebo, one of the highest peaks in the Balqa

The entire Balqa is a limestone plateau, as compared to the gravel and basalt-covered plateau of the Syrian Desert that makes up over 75% of Jordan's land area. The western part of the Balqa, closer to the Jordan River and the Dead Sea, is a relatively fertile zone characterized by its broken ground and deep gorges formed by precipitation-induced erosion. The eastern part of the Balqa sees little rainfall and is characterized by its tabular consistency. In general the Balqa is arid, though the western plains near the Jordan Valley and the depressions allow for some cultivation. This accounts for the ancient and medieval reports of the Balqa's fertility. Like Jabal Ajlun and the Sharat, the Balqa has a dry and temperate climate.

The average elevation of the Balqa is 700–800 meters (2,300–2,600 ft) above sea level. Among the tallest peaks are Tell Nabi Usha (1,096 meters (3,596 ft)) in the northern Balqa and Mount Nebo (835 meters (2,740 ft)) in the south.

Monthly normal high and low temperatures (°C) for the largest localities in the Balqa
City	Jan	Feb	Mar	Apr	May	Jun	Jul	Aug	Sep	Oct	Nov	Dec	Annual Max/Min	Citation
Amman	12/3	13/4	16/6	22/9	27/13	30/15	31/17	32/18	30/16	27/13	20/9	14/5	23/11	
Madaba	12/3	14/4	17/6	22/9	27/12	29/15	30/16	30/17	29/15	27/13	20/9	14/5	23/10	
Salt	12/4	13/4	16/6	21/9	27/13	30/16	31/18	31/18	30/16	26/13	20/10	14/6	23/11	
Zarqa	13/2	15/4	19/6	24/10	30/13	32/16	33/18	33/17	32/16	28/13	21/8	15/4	25/11	

=== Rivers ===
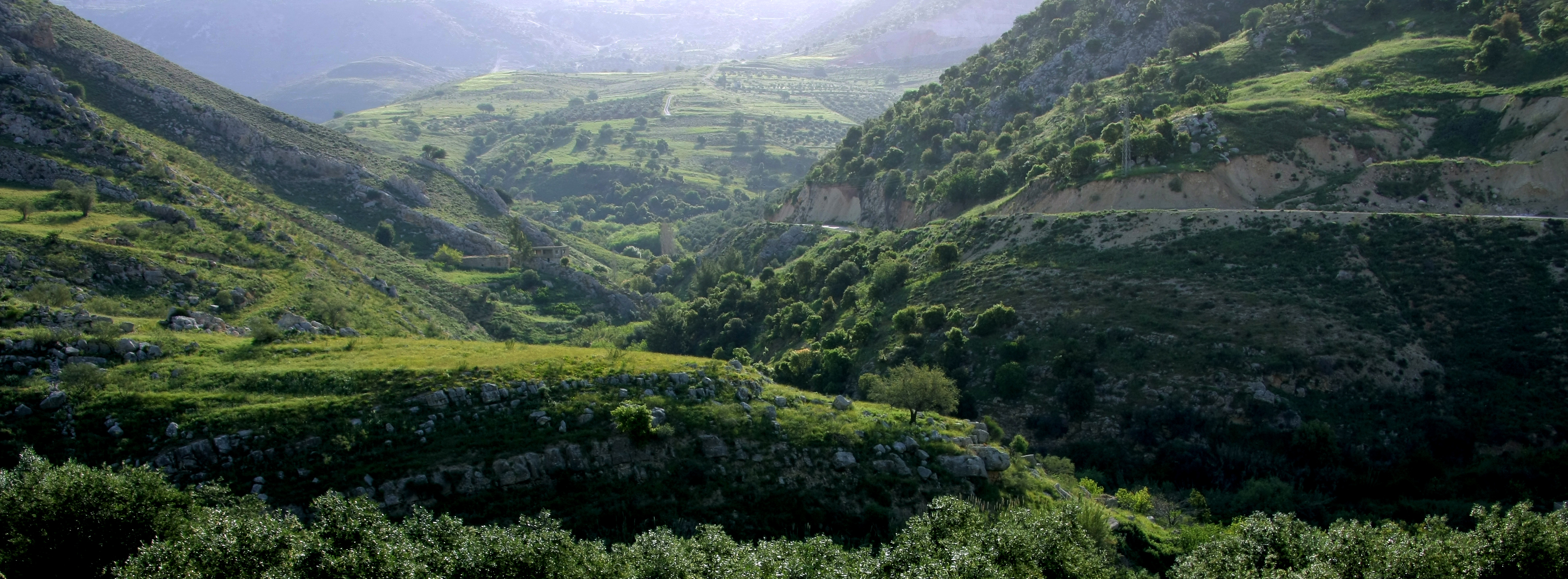
The Wadi Shueib valley, 2010

The perennial Wadi Shueib stream traverses the heart of the western Balqa and creates a fertile valley in which many of the area's western towns sit. The stream deposits into the Jordan Valley. The Zarqa River is a tributary of the Jordan River, while the Wadi Mujib stream flows into the Dead Sea.

== History ==
=== Hellenistic period ===
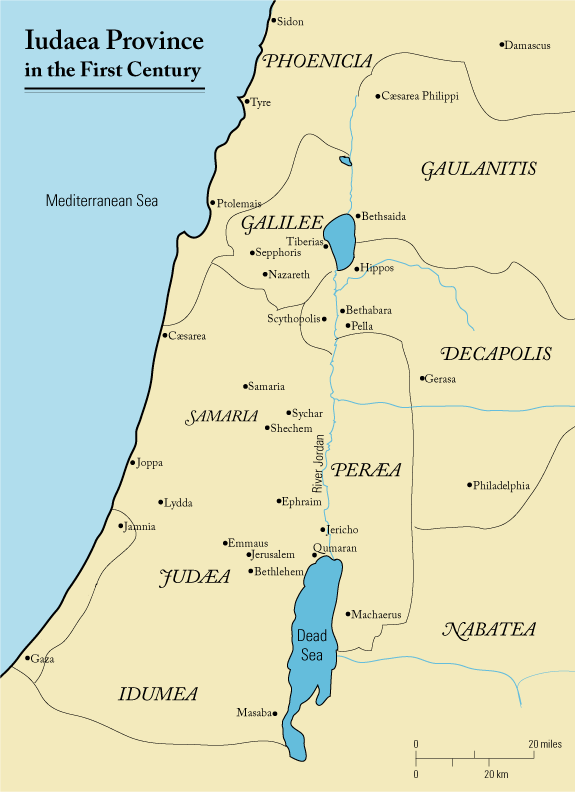
Map of the southern Levant under Roman rule, c. 1st century CE. The Balqa region spanned part of Perea, the Decapolis and Nabatea

During the Hellenistic period, the western part of the Balqa belonged to the administrative district of Perea centered in the city of Gadara (near modern al-Salt), while much of the northeastern Balqa around Philadelphia (modern Amman) formed part of the Decapolis and the southeastern part belonged to Nabatea.

=== Roman and Byzantine periods ===
In 106 CE, during the reign of the Roman emperor Trajan, the whole of the Balqa came under the province of Arabia Petraea. The Balqa remained part of Arabia province during the Byzantine period and the Wadi al-Mujib formed the southern boundary of the province, separating it from the new district of Palestina Tertia. The major towns of Byzantine Balqa were Philadelphia, Esbus (modern Hisban) and Madaba.

=== Early Islamic period ===
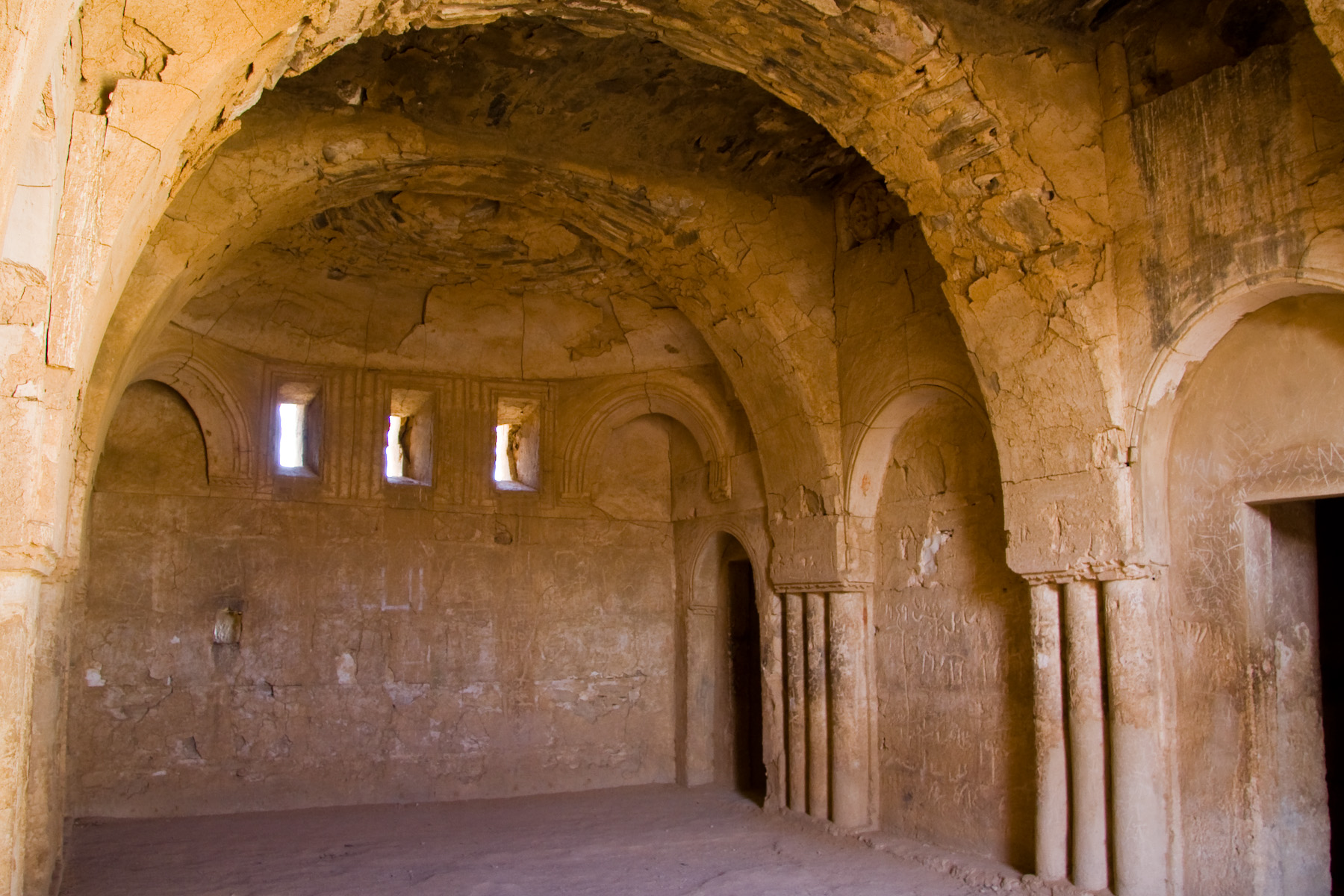
The interior of Qasr al-Kharane, one of several desert palaces built in the Balqa by the Umayyads

At the time of the early Muslim conquests in the 630s, the principal Arab tribes in the Balqa were the Bali, the Judham, and the Ghassanids. The Balqa was conquered by the Muslims under the commander Yazid ibn Abi Sufyan shortly after the capture of Damascus in late 634/early 635 and the peaceful surrender of Amman. Yazid's father Abu Sufyan owned a village in the Balqa called Biqinis. In 661, Yazid's brother Mu'awiya founded the Levant-based Umayyad Caliphate (661–750), under which the Balqa continued to prosper. Caliph Marwan I (r. 684–685) granted the Sakun, a branch of the Kinda tribe the right to settle the Balqa in return for their support against anti-Umayyad tribes in Syria at the Battle of Marj Rahit. Several palatial residences for the Umayyad caliphs and princes were erected throughout the Balqa, including al-Mshatta, Ziza, Qastal, and Umm al-Walid, as well as Qusayr Amra, al-Kharane, Qasr al-Hallabat and Qasr Tuba further east along the desert fringe.

While still a prince, Yazid II built Qastal and al-Muwaqqar, another palace near Amman, and was possibly associated with Umm al-Walid; he ruled as caliph in 720–724 and died in the Balqa town of Irbid. Yazid II's son al-Walid II resided in his Balqa estates during part of his years as the heir apparent of Caliph Hisham and built Qusayr Amra. Al-Walid II's father-in-law, a member of the Umayyad family, Caliph Uthman's great-grandson Sa'id ibn Khalid ibn Amr ibn Uthman, owned an estate called al-Faddayn in the Balqa, which al-Walid II regularly visited. After succeeding Hisham in 743, he continued to live in the Balqa. He imprisoned Hisham's son Sulayman in Amman. Descendants of al-Walid II may have continued to reside in Qastal as late as the early Abbasid period, as possibly attested by gravestones at the site.

Map of Islamic Syria and its districts under the Abbasid Caliphate in the 9th century. The Balqa is shown as part of Dimashq (Damascus), lying east of Filastin (Palestine)

The administrative and geographic definition of the Balqa varied throughout the early Islamic period. Under the Umayyads until at least the late 9th century the Balqa included much of the Jabal Ajlun and Ma'ab areas and was a subdistrict of Jund Dimashq (military district of Damascus) with its own ʿāmil (governor). The historian al-Ya'qubi held that the Balqa was divided into two zones: the Ghor with its center in Jericho (west of the Jordan River) and the Zahir centered in Amman. The writings of the 10th-century geographer al-Muqaddasi indicate that the Balqa shifted to administrative dependence on Jund Filastin (military district of Palestine).

==== Umayyad and Abbasid sub-governors ====
The post of the sub-governor of Balqa first appeared in the Islamic traditional sources during the reign of Caliph Abd al-Malik (r. 685–705).

- Ubayd Allah ibn Marwan, governed for undetermined period under his brother Caliph Abd al-Malik.
- Muhammad ibn Umar al-Thaqafi, governed for undetermined period under Caliph Abd al-Malik. Muhammad was a brother of Yusuf ibn Umar al-Thaqafi from the clan of al-Hajjaj ibn Yusuf. Yusuf ibn Umar had been al-Walid II's governor in Iraq and relocated to his Thaqafi family's estate in the Balqa. The historian Garth Fowden proposed that the family estate may have been Umm al-Walid (Mother of al-Walid) based on the assumption that it belonged to al-Walid II's mother, who belonged to al-Hajjaj's family.
- Al-Walid ibn Qa'qa al-Absi, may have governed for undetermined period under Caliph al-Walid I (r. 705–715).
- Harith ibn Amr al-Ta'i, governed for undetermined period under Caliph Umar II (r. 717–720).
- Unnamed governor under Marwan II (r. 744–750)
- Salih ibn Ali ibn Abdallah ibn Abbas, governor in 750 under his nephew, the Abbasid caliph al-Saffah.
- Abdallah ibn Sulayman ibn Muhammad ibn Abd al-Muttalib, governed for undetermined period under his distant kinsman Caliph al-Mansur (r. 754–775).
- Salih ibn Sulayman ibn Abdallah ibn Abbas, governed from 796 under Ja'far ibn Yahya al-Barmaki, vizier of Salih ibn Sulayman's kinsman Caliph Harun al-Rashid.

=== Ayyubid and Mamluk periods ===
Under the Ayyubids (1180s–1250), the Balqa administratively included and excluded the Sharat, while under the Mamluks the Balqa was a district of the southern march of Mamlakat Dimashq (province of Damascus) with its center in Hisban. At times, the town of al-Salt formed its own wilaya (subdistrict). Practically, it depended, at least temporarily, on Niyabat al-Karak (province of al-Karak) to the south. The major tribes of the Balqa during Mamluk rule were the Banu Sakhr and the Banu Mahdi, both counted as descendants of the Judham, whose presence in the southern Levant dated to the late Byzantine and early Islamic periods.

=== Ottoman era ===
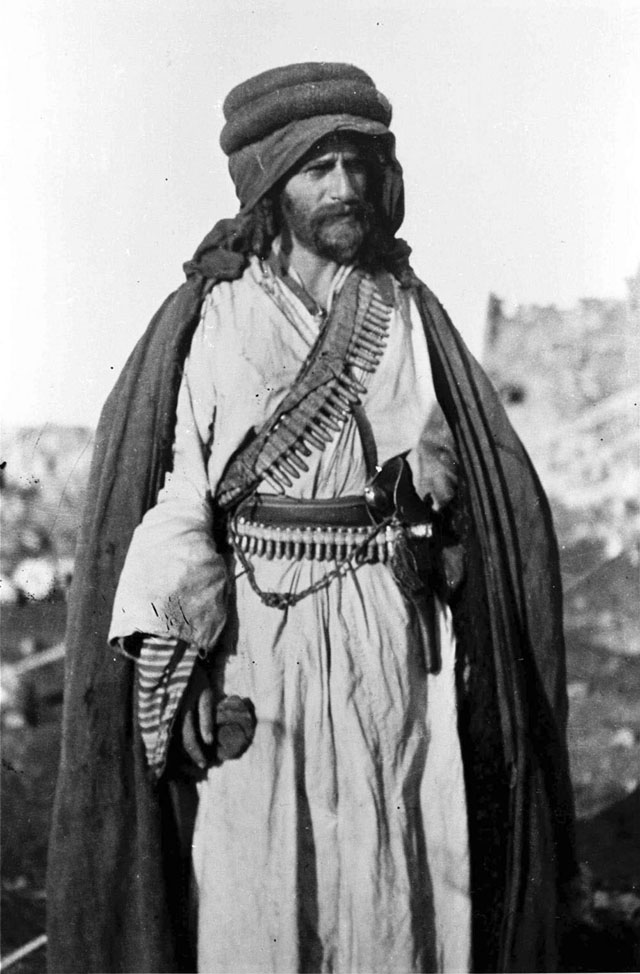
A sheikh of the Da'aja tribe in al-Muwaqqar in the Balqa, c. 1900. The Da'aja were one of two tribes recorded in Ottoman tax records as living in the Balqa in the 16th century

Although Ottoman tax records from the 16th century do not specify the Bedouin tribes living in the Balqa, the Ottoman historian al-Khalidi al-Safadi (d. 1628) noted that two tribes, the Da'aja and Jahawisha, dwelt there. Only four villages were officially recorded in the Balqa during the 16th century. By the end of the 18th century, the only permanent settlement in the region was the mixed Muslim and Christian town of Salt, a situation which persisted until the late 19th century. The rest of the Balqa was dominated by the local Bedouin tribes.

Salt was the most developed town and the commercial center of Transjordan from the 18th century until the early years of the Emirate of Transjordan. The high hills and deep valleys upon which the town was built protected Salt from raids by the Bedouin tribes, with whom the townspeople made commercial accommodations: the tribes guaranteed the townspeople access to their wheat fields in the Balqa's eastern plains and the tribes were able to buy and sell goods in the town's extensive markets. Salt townspeople encamped in Amman and Wadi Wala in the spring until harvest and paid an annual tribute to the dominant tribe of the Balqa, which until the 1810s was the Adwan, known as "lords of the Balqa". Afterward, the Banu Sakhr overtook the Adwan and collected the tribute from Salt. The town's defenses and isolation in a land practically controlled by Bedouin tribes also enabled its inhabitants to ignore the impositions of the Ottoman authorities without consequence.

In 1866–1867 the governor of Syria Vilayet (to which the Balqa nominally belonged), Rashid Pasha, extended the imperial Tanzimat reforms into the Balqa. He launched an expedition against the tribes of the Balqa at the head of a large army. The townspeople of Salt made terms with Rashid Pasha, who repaired the town's fort, garrisoned it with 400 troops and confiscated large amounts of grain and livestock as tax arrears. He established the town as the center of a district encompassing the Balqa, appointed as its governor the Damascene Kurd Faris Agha Kadru and established an elected administrative council composed of the town's elite. He proceeded toward Hisban against the Adwan, which was allied with their traditional rivals the Banu Sakhr and led by Dhi'ab al-Humud. The Ottomans defeated the Adwan, killing or wounding fifty tribesmen, capturing Dhi'ab's son and forcing the tribe's retreat toward Karak. By October Dhi'ab surrendered himself and was imprisoned in Nablus. The following year, the Balqa was appended to the Nablus Sanjak, which became a new district straddling both sides of the Jordan River and called the Mutasarifiyya of Balqa; its first governor was Muhammad Sa'id Pasha, the former governor of the new district of Ajlun. Two years later, the Adwan and Banu Sakhr attempted to reassert their dominance in Transjordan and attacked the village of Ramtha, prompting a second, larger expedition by Rashid Pasha into the Balqa. The Banu Sakhr and the Banu Hamida were cornered into the deep gorges of Wadi Wala, submitted to the Ottoman authorities and paid a large fine. According to the historian Eugene Rogan: "If the first Balqa expedition introduced direct Ottoman rule to the district, the second campaign confirmed that the Ottomans were in Jordan to stay."

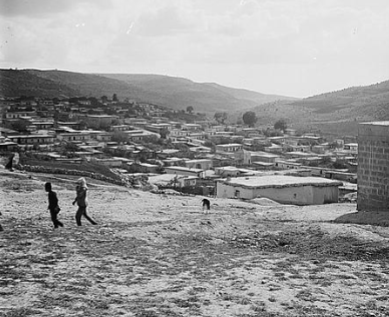
The Circassian settlement of Wadi Sir, 1900, one of several villages founded in the Balqa during the Ottoman-sponsored drive to settle the region in the late 19th century

Between 1878 and 1884 the Ottoman authorities in Damascus launched their first attempt to establish permanent settlements in grain-growing areas in the eastern Balqa with access to regular sources of water. The first settlers were Circassians transported to the region from other parts of the Empire and the first two Circassian villages established in the Balqa were Amman and Wadi Sir. A third village was established at al-Ruman in 1884 by Turkmen settlers. The Turkmens and Circassians were known to be highly loyal to the Ottomans, skilled in agriculture and willing to combat Bedouin raiders. During roughly the same period, Christian townspeople established settlements in the Balqa after leaving established towns in Transjordan. Between 1869 and 1875, Christians from Salt transformed the nearby encampment of Fuheis from sixteen tents to twenty-five–thirty houses. Between 1870 and 1879, members of the Christian family of Sayegh established the village of Rumaymin in the vicinity of Salt, and in 1881 Christians from Karak established a permanent settlement at Madaba, which became the southernmost settlement of the Balqa, with support from the Latin Patriarchate of Jerusalem and the governor of Damascus Midhat Pasha.

The establishment of farming villages by settlers and local Christians spurred the development of the Bedouin plantation village, which were small hamlets registered in the name of Bedouin tribesmen and farmed largely by peasants from Palestine and Egypt. By 1883, nine such tax-paying plantation villages were established in the Balqa: Jalul, Sahab was Salbud, al-Raqib, Juwayda, Dhiban, Manja, Umm al-Amad, al-Ghabya and Barazin. The Balqa remained a kaza (called after Salt) attached to the Nablus Sanjak, including after the sanjak's incorporation into the Beirut Vilayet established in 1888, during which Khalil Bek El-Assaad was in office, Balqa remained under his clan's control until the kaza of Salt was transferred.. Between 1901 and 1906 five new Circassian and Chechen settlements were established at Zarqa, Rusayfa, Na'ur, Suwaylih and Sukhna, all to the east of Amman. In 1905 the kaza of Salt was transferred to the Karak Sanjak, part of the Damascus Vilayet. By 1908, there were at least nineteen Bedouin plantation villages around Madaba. During the same approximate period, the Abu Jabir clan of Salt began to cultivate their sixty-feddan farms 3 kilometers (1.9 mi) south of Amman.

The Circassians introduced a network of dirt roads throughout the Balqa, which could accommodate their large-wheeled carts. Interconnectivity with the rest of the Empire and centralization increased with the construction of the Hejaz Railway, which connected Amman to Damascus upon its inauguration in 1903. The following year the line was extended from Amman southward to Ma'an and by 1908 to Medina. The Circassians of the Balqa were employed in the construction, maintenance and lower management of the railway, and Circassian ox-driven carts transported goods from Damascus to the markets of the Balqa after the arrival of the goods to Amman by train.

=== British period ===
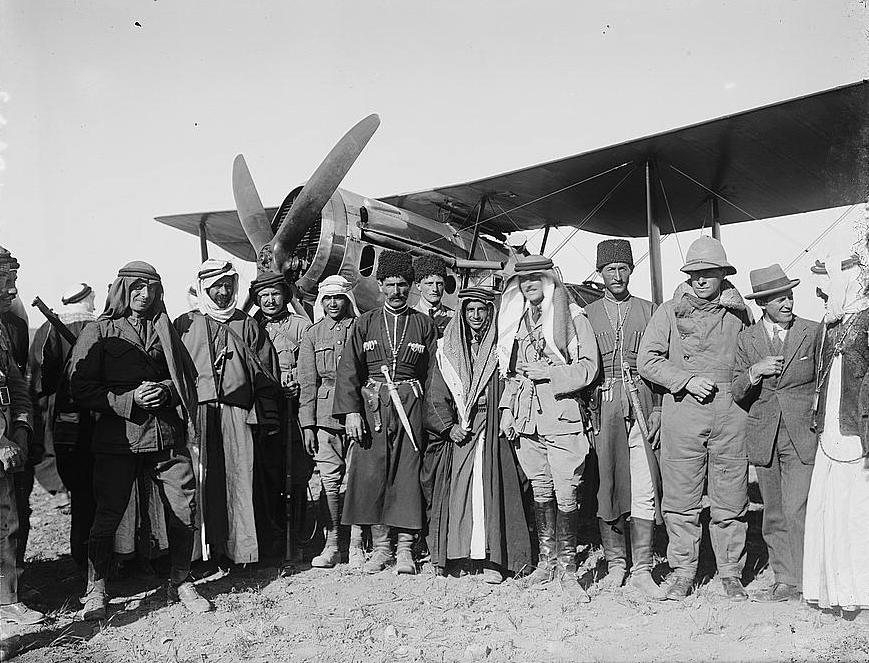
Bedouin and Circassian chiefs with British officers on the Aerodome at Amman, 1921

The occupation of Transjordan and the wider Levant by British-led Allied forces during World War I marked the end of the late Ottoman period of growing trade, settlement and cultivation in the Balqa. With the disruptions to the railway caused by the war, trade and security eroded and Bedouin tribesmen who had begun transitioning to plantation farming or cultivation reverted to nomadism. The importance of the area also decreased under the British and French mandatory powers whose focus centered on Palestine, the northern half of the Levant and Mesopotamia. Commerce eventually returned to the Balqa, but underwent significant change as a result of new borders separating it from Damascus and Medina and new foreign interests. In a 1922 population survey, the Balqa district had a settled population of 39,600 living in fifteen settlements, the largest of which was Salt (pop. 20,000), followed by Wadi Sir, Amman and Madaba whose populations ranged between 2,400 and 3,200. There were 59,500 Adwan, Balqawiyya, Banu Hamida and Salit tribesmen living in 11,900 tents, while the Banu Sakhr, whose encampments were not restricted to the Balqa, had 5,500 tents and counted 27,500 tribesmen. With the exception of a mostly Greek Orthodox and Greek Catholic Christian minority in Salt, its smaller satellite villages of Fuheis and Rumaymin, and Madaba, the inhabitants were Sunni Muslims. Other than the Circassian/Chechens who represented about 5% of Transjordan's population, the inhabitants of the Balqa and Transjordan in general were ethnically Arab, the main social division being between pastoralists and peasants. The main crops of the Balqa were corn, wheat and barley, as well as the well-known grapes of Salt.

Relations between the settled residents and the Bedouin, the Circassians and the Arabs and the Muslims and Christians were generally amicable at the time. Most conflict, when it occurred, centered on competition for land between the Bedouin and the settled people. The semi-nomadic Adwan had lost its paramountcy in the Balqa to the largely nomadic Banu Sakhr during the 19th century and the latter tribe remained dominant in the Balqa under indirect British rule. The Adwan and Banu Hasan, who dwelt north of Amman along the Zarqa River, were allied against the Banu Sakhr, and the tribal rivalry continued in the early years of British rule. The British had recognized the Hashemite emir Abdullah as the Emir of Transjordan, separating the region's governance from the direct British administration in neighboring Palestine. Abdullah had courted and granted high favor the more powerful Banu Sakhr; to guarantee their loyalty from the burgeoning influence of the Wahhabi movement of Ibn Saud, the emir granted the tribe large tracts and assessed taxes at a fractional rate to that imposed on the Adwan and other Balqa tribes. By August 1923, the taxation disparity and tribal rivalries had grown and the following month the paramount emir of the Adwan at the head of his tribesmen marched toward Abdullah's residence in Amman in what became known as the Adwan Rebellion. They were intercepted by the British-led Arab Legion units not long after their departure from Sweileh. In the ensuing clashes, 86 Adwan tribesmen, including 13 women, were killed or injured and the tribe's leader fled to the Jabal al-Druze in French Mandatory Syria.

== Demography ==
More than half of Jordan's population live in the Balqa. As a result of the influxes of Palestinian refugees into Jordan as a result of the Arab-Israeli wars of 1948 and 1967, Palestinians, i.e. those whose origins are traced to modern-day Israel, the West Bank and the Gaza Strip, accounted for about 70% of the population of the Amman, Balqa and az-Zarqa governorates in the 1990s. During the same period, the population of the preexisting inhabitants of the region, who largely belonged to confederations of mostly unrelated Arab tribes, stood at about 350,000, though this number is an unofficial estimate as the Jordanian census does not provide specific information on the Balqa tribes.

Until around the 1960s and 1970s, most of the Arab tribesmen of the Balqa had been semi-nomadic pastoralists and farmers who migrated between their winter campsites in the Jordan Valley and their highland campsites in the Balqa during spring and summer. Afterward, members of the tribes increasingly transitioned into wage earners or permanent agriculturalists and the seasonal campsites transitioned into permanent settlements. As of the 1990s, most lived as suburbanites in the metropolitan areas of Madaba, Amman, as-Salt and az-Zarqa. The main Arab tribes of the Balqa are the Abbad, the Adwan, the Hadid, the Ajarma, the Balqawiyya, Bani Hasan, Bani Hamida, the Da'aja, the Ghanaymat and the Saltiyya. The largest land-owning tribe are the Abbad, who are a confederation of genealogically unrelated clans, counting about 100,000 members, living in the territory between Wadi al-Shitta in the south and the Zarqa River, and eastward to Amman. From the mid-18th to the mid-20th century, the most powerful tribe of the Balqa were the Adwan, a relatively small tribe that arrived in the region around the 1700s.

From the establishment of the Emirate of Transjordan (precursor to the modern Kingdom of Jordan) in 1921, the Balqa Bedouin have not been officially considered 'Bedouin', which was the legal designation for the nomadic, camel-herding tribes of Jordan's eastern and southern deserts until the designation was abolished in 1976. Nonetheless, the descendants of the Balqa tribes continue to consider themselves Bedouin who have historically cultivated the land but distinct from the fellahin (peasants) who lived north of the Zarqa River.

== Bibliography ==
- Ahmed, Asad Q. (2010). The Religious Elite of the Early Islamic Ḥijāz: Five Prosopographical Case Studies. Oxford: University of Oxford Linacre College Unit for Prosopographical Research. ISBN 978-1-900934-13-8.
- Bacharach, Jere L. (1996). "Marwanid Umayyad Building Activities: Speculations on Patronage". Muqarnas Online. 13: 27–44. doi:10.1163/22118993-90000355. ISSN 2211-8993. JSTOR 1523250.
- Bakhit, Muhammad Adnan (1982). The Ottoman Province of Damascus in the Sixteenth Century. Beirut: Libraire du Liban. ISBN 9780866853224.
- Barakat, Nora Elizabeth (Spring 2015). An Empty Land? Nomads and Property Administration in Hamidian Syria (PhD). Berkeley: University of California.
- Bosworth, C. E. (1982). Medieval Arabic Culture and Administration. London: Variorum. ISBN 0-86078-113-5.
- Bosworth, C. E., ed. (1989). The History of al-Ṭabarī, Volume XXX: The ʿAbbāsid Caliphate in Equilibrium: The Caliphates of Mūsā al-Hādī and Hārūn al-Rashīd, A.D. 785–809/A.H. 169–192. SUNY Series in Near Eastern Studies. Albany, New York: State University of New York Press. ISBN 978-0-88706-564-4.
- Crone, Patricia (1980). Slaves on Horses: The Evolution of the Islamic Polity (1980 ed.). Cambridge: Cambridge University Press. ISBN 978-0521229616.
- Elad, Amikam (2016). The Rebellion of Muḥammad al-Nafs al-Zakiyya in 145/762: Ṭālibīs and Early ʿAbbāsīs in Conflict. Leiden: Brill. ISBN 978-90-04-22989-1.
- Fowden, Garth (2004). Quṣayr ʻAmra: Art and the Umayyad Elite in Late Antique Syria. Berkeley and Los Angeles: University of California Press. ISBN 0-520-23665-3.
- Gil, Moshe (1997) [1983]. A History of Palestine, 634–1099. Translated by Ethel Broido. Cambridge: Cambridge University Press. ISBN 0-521-59984-9.
- Kennedy, Hugh, ed. (1990). The History of al-Ṭabarī, Volume XXIX: Al-Mansūr and al-Mahdī, A.D. 763–786/A.H. 146–169. SUNY Series in Near Eastern Studies. Albany, New York: State University of New York Press. ISBN 978-0-7914-0142-2.
- Kennedy, Hugh N. (2010). "Syrian Elites from Byzantium to Islam: Survival or Extinction". In Haldon, Josh (ed.). Money, Power and Politics in Early Islamic Syria: A Review of Current Debates. Farnham: Ashgate Publishing. pp. 181–199. ISBN 978-0-7546-6849-7.
- Powers, David S., ed. (1989). The History of al-Ṭabarī, Volume XXIV: The Empire in Transition: The Caliphates of Sulaymān, ʿUmar, and Yazīd, A.D. 715–724/A.H. 96–105. SUNY Series in Near Eastern Studies. Albany, New York: State University of New York Press. ISBN 978-0-7914-0072-2.
- Rogan, Eugene L. (1994). "Bringing the State Back: The Limits of Ottoman Rule in Jordan, 1840–1910". In Rogan, Eugene L.; Tell, Tariq (eds.). Village, Steppe and State: The Social Origins of Modern Jordan. London: British Academic Press. pp. 32–47. ISBN 1-85043-829-3.
- Rogan, Eugene L. (1999). Frontiers of the State in the Late Ottoman Empire: Transjordan, 1850–1921. Cambridge: Cambridge University Press. ISBN 0-521-66312-1.
- Salibi, Kamal (1993). The Modern History of Jordan. I. B. Tauris. ISBN 1860643310.
- Shryock, Andrew (1997). Nationalism and the Genealogical Imagination: Oral History and Textual Authority in Tribal Jordan. Berkely and Los Angeles: University of California Press. ISBN 0-520-20100-0.
- Shryock, Andrew (April 1995). "Popular Genealogical Nationalism: History Writing and Identity among the Balqa Tribes of Jordan". Comparative Studies in Society and History. 37 (2): 327–357. doi:10.1017/S001041750001968X. JSTOR 179284.
- Shryock, Andrew (Spring 1997b). "Bedouin in Suburbia: Redrawing the Boundaries of Urbanity and Tribalism in Amman, Jordan". The Arab Studies Journal. 5 (1): 40–56. JSTOR 27933719.
- Sourdel-Thomine, J. (1960). "Al-Balkāʾ". In Gibb, H. A. R.; Kramers, J. H.; Lévi-Provençal, E.; Schacht, J.; Lewis, B. & Pellat, Ch. (eds.). The Encyclopaedia of Islam, Second Edition. Volume I: A–B. Leiden: E. J. Brill. pp. 997–998. OCLC 495469456.
- Wilson, Mary C. (1987). King Abdullah, Britain and the Making of Jordan. New York: Cambridge University Press. ISBN 0-521-32421-1.
- Williams, John Alden, ed. (1985). The History of al-Ṭabarī, Volume XXVII: The ʿAbbāsid Revolution, A.D. 743–750/A.H. 126–132. SUNY Series in Near Eastern Studies. Albany, New York: State University of New York Press. ISBN 978-0-87395-884-4.
