= Marwan ibn Abi al-Janub =

Abbasid-era Arab poet and governor

Marwan ibn Abi al-Janub (Arabic: مروان إبن أبي الجنوب) (fl. 813–861) was a 9th century poet from Abbasid Baghdad. He was also governor of Bahrayn and Yamama. Marwan al-Janub was also known as Marwan al-Aṣghar (Arabic: مروان الأصغر).

== Background and career ==
Marwan al-Janub was from a family of prominent poets, the most famous being his grandfather Marwan ibn Abi Hafsa (723–c. 797/8). Both were descendants of Abu Hafsa Yazid, a tax administrator and possible court physician who married the daughter of the amir of al-Yamama after being freed from servitude by Marwan I in 656.

Al-Janub wrote panegyric poetry for Caliphs al-Ma'mun (r. 813–833), al-Mu'tasim (r. 833–842), al-Wathiq (r. 842–847) and al-Mutawakkil (r. 847–861). From al-Mutawakkil, he sought political favor by composing anti-Shi'a poems. He also commemorated the day that al-Mutawakkil appointed his three sons as heirs by chanting an ode to them. Most contemporaneous and subsequent critics considered al-Janub's poetry mediocre, however little of it has survived.

Al-Mutawakkil made al-Janub governor of Bahrayn and Yamama. But in 861, he lost his positions when al-Mutawakkil was assassinated and his eldest son al-Muntasir came to power.
