= Fakhitah bint Abi Hashim =

Wife of Umayyad caliph Yazid I and Marwan

Fakhitah bint Abi Hashim فاختة بنت أبي هاشم
- Born: Hejaz/Syria, Rashidun Caliphate
- Died: 690s Damascus, Umayyad Caliphate
- Spouse: Yazid I (until his death 683); Marwan I (684–685)
- Children: Khalid ibn Yazid
- Family: Abd Shams (by birth); Umayyad (by marriage)
- Father: Abu Hashim ibn Utba al-Abshami
- Religion: Islam

Fakhitah bint Abi Hashim (Arabic: فاختة بنت أبي هاشم), (fl. 680s–690s) also known as Umm Hashim or Umm Khalid was the wife of second Umayyad caliph Yazid I. Fakhita was the first and probably the only woman in the Umayyad history who had relation through marriage with both ruling house of Umayyad Caliphate; the Sufyanid house and Marwanid house, through her second marriage to fourth Umayyad caliph Marwan I.

== Biography ==
The names of two of Yazid's known wives are: Umm Khalid Fakhita bint Abi Hashim (and Umm Kulthum, a daughter of the veteran commander and statesman Abd Allah ibn Amir). Fakhita and Umm Kulthum both hailed from the Abd Shams, the parent clan of the Umayyads.

Fakhitah was the mother of Yazid's younger son Khalid. Her husband came to the throne in 680. Her husband ruled the Caliphate 680 to 683. Her husband Yazid I, had made bay'ah (allegiance) to his son Mu'awiya. Mu'awiya II succeeded his father in Damascus in 64 AH (November 683 CE), at an age of somewhere between 17 and 23. Mu'awiya was the son of another wife of Yazid thus the step-son of Fakhitah. Her step-son's reign would have lasted for about 20 days to 4 months, but likely no more than 2 months. Due to premature death of Mu'awiya II, he died, without nominating a successor.

After Mu'awiya II's death, her son Khalid became a candidate to the Caliphate, however due to his young age in the end, their choice fell on his more experienced kinsman Marwan.

Marwan wed Yazid's widow and mother of Khalid, Umm Hashim Fakhita, thereby establishing a political link with the Sufyanids. Wellhausen viewed the marriage as an attempt by Marwan to seize the inheritance of Yazid by becoming stepfather to his sons. Fakhitah died during the Caliphate of her step-son Abd al-Malik ibn Marwan (r. 685–705).

=== Mariticide legends about her ===
Although it is reported in the traditional Muslim sources that Marwan was killed in his sleep by Umm Hashim Fakhita in retaliation for a serious verbal insult to her honor by the caliph, most western historians dismiss the story. Based on a report by al-Mas'udi, Bosworth and others suspect Marwan succumbed to a plague afflicting Syria at the time of his death.

== Sources ==
- Howard, I. K. A., ed. (1990). The History of al-Ṭabarī, Volume XIX: The Caliphate of Yazīd ibn Muʿāwiyah, A.D. 680–683/A.H. 60–64. SUNY Series in Near Eastern Studies. Albany, New York: State University of New York Press. ISBN 978-0-7914-0040-1.
- Bosworth, C. E. (1993). "Muʿāwiya II". In Bosworth, C. E.; van Donzel, E.; Heinrichs, W. P. & Pellat, Ch. (eds.). The Encyclopaedia of Islam, Second Edition. Volume VII: Mif–Naz. Leiden: E. J. Brill. pp. 268–269. ISBN 978-90-04-09419-2.
- Robinson, Majied (2020). Marriage in the Tribe of Muhammad: A Statistical Study of Early Arabic Genealogical Literature. Berlin: Walter de Gruyter. ISBN 978-3-11-062416-8.
- Bosworth, C.E. (1991). "Marwān I b. al-Ḥakam". In Bosworth, C. E.; van Donzel, E. & Pellat, Ch. (eds.). The Encyclopaedia of Islam, Second Edition. Volume VI: Mahk–Mid. Leiden: E. J. Brill. pp. 621–623. ISBN 978-90-04-08112-3.
- Madelung, Wilferd (1997). The Succession to Muhammad: A Study of the Early Caliphate. Cambridge: Cambridge University Press. ISBN 0-521-56181-7.
