= Abu Hafsa Yazid =

Servant of 7th-century Umayyad caliph

Abu Hafsa Yazid (Arabic: أبو حفصة يزيد, romanized: Abū Ḥafṣa Yazīd) was a mawla, or servant, of the Umayyad Caliph Marwan ibn al-Hakkam (r. 684–685).

== Background and career ==
Yazid's full name is not known; Abu Hafsa means "father of Hafsa" (an Arabic kunya). Abu Hafsa Yazid's origins are unclear; he may have been either Persian or Jewish. He may have been taken prisoner as a youth in the capture of Istakhr in ca 650 CE, and later sold to the Caliph. Marwan freed him on the day of the assassination of Uthman ibn Affan (17 June 656). Sources vary as to whether Abu Hafsa Yazid converted to Islam.

Marwan assigned Yazid to posts including taxation in Medina. He married the daughter of the amir of al-Yamama, and among their descendants were several prominent poets of the early Islamic period, including Marwan ibn Abi Hafsa (723–c. 797/8) and Marwan ibn Abi al-Janub (fl. 813–861).

Abu Hafsa Yazid is sometimes described as court physician to the Rashidun Caliph Umar I around the year 643 CE. However, this may be an error based on writings by later Arab historians, as he is not called a physician in the earliest texts.
