= Aban ibn Marwan =

Governor of Palestine and Jordan

Aban ibn Marwan أبان بن مروان

Governor of Palestine
- In office 685 – 690s
- Monarch: Abd al-Malik

Personal details
- Spouse: Zaynab bint Abd al-Rahman
- Relations: Al-Hakam ibn Abi al-As (grandfather); Uthman (grand father)
- Children: Abd al-Aziz
- Parents: Marwan I (father); Umm Aban al-Kubra (mother)
- Occupation: Governor of Palestine and/or the Balqa

Abū ʿUthmān Abān ibn Marwān ibn al-Ḥakam (Arabic: أبو عثمان أبان بن مروان بن الحكم) was an Umayyad prince and governor of Palestine under his brother, Caliph Abd al-Malik (r. 685–705).

== Career ==
Aban was the son of the Umayyad caliph Marwan I (r. 684–685) and Umm Aban al-Kubra, a daughter of the third caliph, Uthman (r. 644–656). Aban's half-brother, Abd al-Malik (r. 685–705), appointed him, for an undetermined period, governor of Palestine and the Balqa subdistrict of Damascus. According to the historian Moshe Gil, Aban was later made governor of Jordan. Al-Hajjaj ibn Yusuf, one of the most powerful figures in the Umayyad Caliphate as viceroy of Iraq and the eastern provinces, started his career in the shurta (security forces) of Aban.

== Family and descendants ==
Aban was married to Zaynab bint Abd al-Rahman, a granddaughter of the commander al-Harith ibn Hisham of the Banu Makhzum clan. She gave birth to Aban's children; although scholar Majied Robinson holds none of their children are named in the sources, orientalist Leone Caetani names Abd al-Aziz, citing the Kitab al-aghani. According to Ibn Asakir, Abd al-Aziz left numerous descendants in Syria.

== Bibliography ==
- Caetani, Leone; Gabrieli, Giuseppe (1915). Onomasticon Arabicum, Volume 2, A'abil—Abdallah. Rome: Casa Editrice Italiana.
- Crone, Patricia (1980). Slaves on Horses: The Evolution of the Islamic Polity (1980 ed.). Cambridge: Cambridge University Press. ISBN 978-0521229616.
- Donner, Fred (2014). "Was Marwan ibn al-Hakam the First "Real" Muslim". In Savant, Sarah Bowen; de Felipe, Helena (eds.). Genealogy and Knowledge in Muslim Societies: Understanding the Past. Edinburgh University Press. ISBN 978-0-7486-4497-1.
- Gil, Moshe (1997) [1983]. A History of Palestine, 634–1099. Translated by Ethel Broido. Cambridge: Cambridge University Press. ISBN 0-521-59984-9.
- Northedge, Alastair; Bennett, Crystal M. (1992). Studies on Roman and Islamic ʻAmmān: History, Site and Architecture, Vol. 1. British Institute in Amman for Archaeology and History.
- Robinson, Chase F. (2010). "The Violence of the Abbasid Revolution". In Suleiman, Yasir (ed.). Living Islamic History: Studies in Honour of Professor Carole Hillenbrand. Edinburgh: Edinburgh University Press. pp. 226–251. ISBN 978-0-7486-3738-6.
- Robinson, Majied (2020). Marriage in the Tribe of Muhammad: A Statistical Study of Early Arabic Genealogical Literature. Berlin: Walter de Gruyter. ISBN 9783110624168.
