= Al-Sharat =

Highland region in modern southern Jordan and northwestern Saudi Arabia

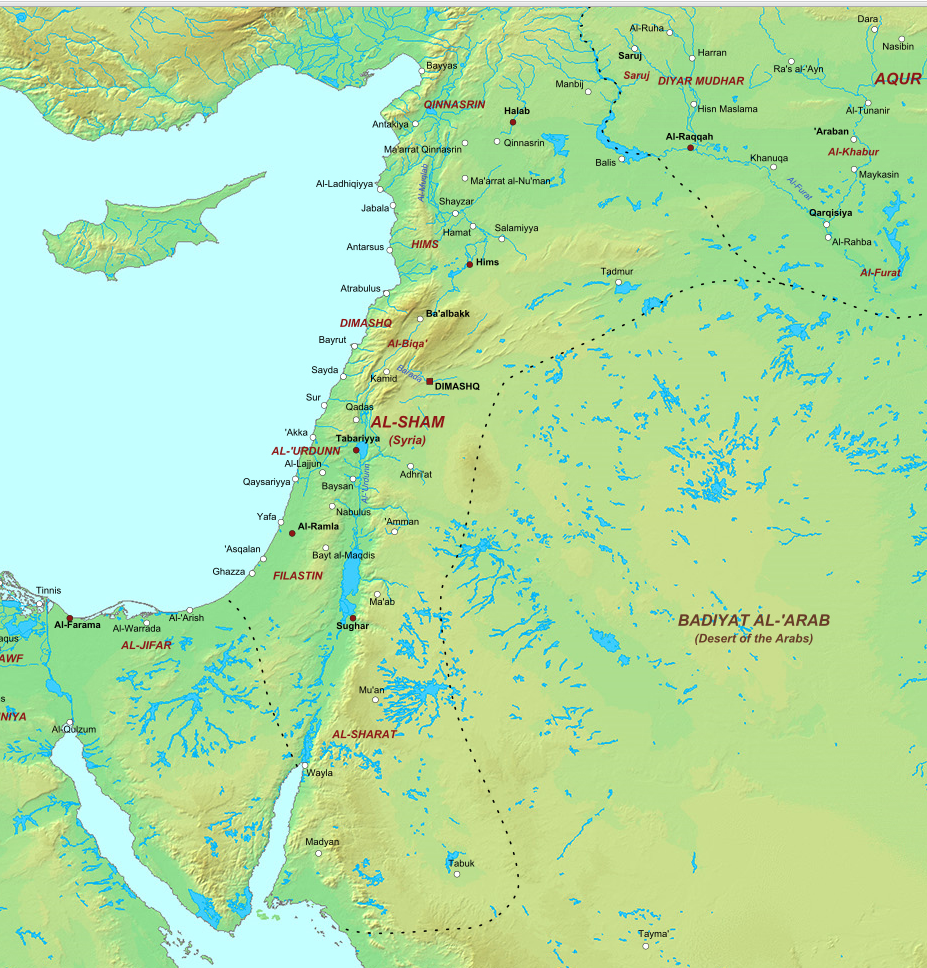
The district of Al-Sharat in circa 985 shown in the southern part of the province of Bilad al-Sham

Ash-Sharāt or Ash-Sharāh (Arabic: ٱلشَّرَاة, also known as Bilād ash-Sharāt (Arabic: بِلَاد ٱلشَّرَاة) or Jibāl ash-Sharāt (Arabic: جِبَال ٱلشَّرَاة), is a highland region in modern-day southern Jordan and northwestern Saudi Arabia. It was formerly a sub-district in Bilad al-Sham during the 7th–11th centuries CE.

It roughly corresponds to the biblical Mount Seir.

== Geography ==
In modern-day Jordan, the region of Al-Sharat starts immediately south of Wadi Mujib. The northern range contains mountains with peaks up to 1,200 meters above sea level, while to the south the mountains get as high as 1,500 metres (4,900 feet) above sea level. The principal city of Bilad al-Sharat is Al-Karak. The northern part of the region in Jordan is under the administration of the Karak Governorate, while the more arid part south of Wadi Arabah comes under the Ma'an Governorate.

In the 9th century, Al-Sharat's capital was Adhruh, but by the late 10th century, it apparently was replaced by Sughar (Zoar). Other principal towns in the district included Tabuk, Ma'an (Mu'an), Madyan, Aynunah (on the northern Red Sea coast), Wayla (Ayla) and Maab (Rabba).

== History ==
From the beginning of the Muslim conquest of the Levant, Al-Sharat formed the southern kurah (district) of Jund Dimashq (Province of Damascus), until the late 9th century, after which it became part of Jund Filastin (Province of Palestine). It was the Tulunids who first attached Al-Sharat to Filastin for practical purposes, as the district was closer to Filastin than Damascus. In 985, during the late Abbasid period, the Jerusalemite geographer Al-Muqaddasi described Al-Sharat as its own district, neither belonging to Dimashq nor Filastin, in the larger province of Bilad al-Sham (Islamic Syria).

The district of Al-Sharat was contiguous with Al-Jibal, which was considered to be the actual "mountains of Edom". Persian geographer Al-Istakhri (d. 957) described the Palestinian districts as "extremely fertile and rich" and dominated by marauding Bedouin tribes. In the late 10th century, the old-established Yamani tribes of Lakhm and Judham were engaged in a struggle over dominance of Al-Sharat with newcomers from the tribe of Tayy. Though information about the Fatimid administration over the Levant is vague, Caliph Al-Aziz (975–996) may have made Al-Sharat (south of Wadi Mujib) its own province which lasted until the Crusader invasion in the early 12th century.

The Crusaders annexed Al-Sharat in the 1110s. Initially, it was part of the royal demesne of the Kingdom of Jerusalem, but in 1126, the feudal lordship of Oultrejordain was formed out of the former district of Al-Sharat. Its jurisdiction extended from the Zarqa River in the north to the Red Sea in the south. The Crusaders built the fortresses of Montreal (Shawbak) in 1115 and Crac (Al-Karak) in 1145. Both became major centers of the lordship. By the mid-12th century, the inhabitants of Al-Sharat were mainly Bedouin from various Qaysi tribes. At that time, the Muslim geographer Muhammad al-Idrisi (d. 1165) wrote about the fertility of the district and that it produced an abundance of olives, almonds, figs, grapes and pomegranates.

Bilad al-Sharat was conquered by the Ayyubids under Saladin in 1187. During Ayyubid rule, Syrian geographer Yaqut al-Hamawi (d. 1229) noted that Al-Sharat was a mountainous region through which the Hajj caravan road from Damascus to Mecca passed. During Mamluk rule, Al-Sharat became Mamlakat al-Karak (Province of al-Karak). By the mid-19th century, Bedouin from the Huwaytat tribe were encroaching into the southern parts of Bilad al-Sharat, and amid the Bedouin-induced anarchy in the region, Christians from Tafilah and al-Karak began fleeing to the north. During that time, Bilad al-Sharat, with the exception of Aqaba, was largely part of the Ottoman district of Mutassarifyya al-Karak.

== See also ==
- Mashriq
- Middle East
- Mount Seir (ancient/biblical name), which roughly corresponds with Al-Sharat
