= Marouane Braiek =

Tunisian footballer

Personal information
- Date of birth: 14 August 1985 (age 41)
- Position: Goalkeeper

Senior career*
Years	Team	Apps	(Gls)
2008–2012	US Monastir		
2012–2014	CA Bizertin		
2015–2020	ES Métlaoui		
2018	→ US Ben Guerdane (loan)		
- * Club domestic league appearances and goals

Marouane Braiek (born 14 August 1985) is a retired Tunisian football goalkeeper.
