= Banu Marwan ibn Wada'a =

Arab clan originating in Saudi Arabia

Banu Marwan ibn Wada'a (Arabic: بنو مروان بن وداعة)
- Juhaynah, 'Akk
- Nisba: AL-Marwani
- Location: Saudi Arabia; Yemen; Oman; Qatar
- Descended from: Marwan bin Wada'a bin Zayd bin Imran bin Rabi'a bin Abs bin Shahara bin Ghalib bin Abd Allah bin 'Akk
- Religion: Sunni Islam

Banu Marwan ibn Wada'a (Arabic: بنو مروان بن وداعة), are a clan of Juhaynah tribe. They are the leaders of Juhaynah tribe, whose parent tribe is the 'Akk. They are Sunni Tribe in the Arabian Peninsula. There is no official tribe population count but it is estimated to be approximately one million in Saudi Arabia. The tribe Chief, Sheikh. Saad Bin Mohammed Bin Salah Algonaim Almarwani Aljohani. As of 2021, the current Sheikh is Aied Bin Saiah Bin Saad Bin Mohammed Algonaim. The tribal lands extend from the Red Sea coast in Yanbu (Western Part of Saudi Arabia) to the heart of Najd in the central region of Saudi Arabia, and from North lands extend from Madinah (a holy city for Muslims) to Al Qunfudhah in the south. The tribe's reach extends to other countries like Qatar and reported the tribe family tree, that one of their descendants is an American individual, who was born in early nineties to white American mother from Kyle, Texas and Saudi Arabian father, who was a student at Lamar university during the child birth, which happened that the father was the son of Almarwani tribe leader, which makes this child the grandson of the tribe leader. As of February 2021, the grandson lives in Austin Texas and is expecting a child due in October 2021.

== See also ==
- Tribes of Arabia
- Quda'a
