= Jund Dimashq =

Sub-province of Syrian province in the Arab Caliphate

Syria (Bilad al-Sham) and its provinces under the Abbasid Caliphate in the 9th century

Jund Dimashq (Arabic: جند دمشق) was the largest of the sub-provinces (ajnad, sing. jund), into which Syria was divided under the Umayyad and Abbasid dynasties. It was named after its capital and largest city, Damascus ("Dimashq"), which in the Umayyad period was also the capital of the Caliphate.

== Geography and administrative division ==
Unlike any other province of the Caliphate, Syria was divided by the early Umayyads into several (originally four, later five) sub-provinces or ajnad (singular jund, "army division"), which in their original inception were the areas from which a particular army division drew its pay, provisions and recruits. The province of Damascus, jund Dimashq, was the largest of the ajnad, comprising most of central Syria. Its borders encompassed roughly the former Byzantine provinces of Phoenice Prima, Phoenice Libanensis, and Arabia.

Later Arab geographers divide the jund of Damascus into the following districts: the Ghuta plain around Damascus, known as the "Garden Land" for its fertility; the Hawran and Bathaniyya, with Adra'a as capital; Jawlan; Jaydur (mentioned only by Yaqut al-Hamawi); Hula; Balqa; al-Sharah, with capital at Adhruh, sometimes recorded as belonging to Jund Filastin; and al-Jibal. Other principal towns and cities were Beirut, Sidon, Tyre (the tax proceeds of which went to Jund al-Urdunn), Tripoli and Jubail along the coast. The coastal cities and their immediate surroundings formed their own small districts.

In its tribal make-up, the jund of Damascus was chiefly Yamani, but with a sizeable minority of Qaysi tribes. The annual tax proceeds of the province totalled 450,000 gold dinars according to Ya'qubi, 400,000 according to al-Baladhuri, and 420,000 according to al-Jahshiyari; Qudama ibn Ja'far gives the low number of 110,000 dinars, but this probably reflects the effects of the civil war of the Fourth Fitna. In terms of troops, under the Caliph al-Walid I (r. 705–715), 45,000 men were in the rolls for the jund of Damascus, although presumably not all of them were effectives.

== Governors ==
=== Umayyad period ===
- Dahhak ibn Qays al-Fihri (661–680; governed under Caliph Mu'awiya I)
- Abd al-Rahman ibn Umm al-Hakam al-Thaqafi (undetermined period in 685–705 during the rule of Caliph Abd al-Malik)
- Abd al-Aziz ibn al-Walid (undetermined period in 705–715 during the rule of his father Caliph al-Walid I)
- Muhammad ibn Suwayd ibn Kulthum al-Fihri (715–720; a kinsman of Dahhak ibn Qays; governed under Caliph Sulayman ibn Abd al-Malik and continued under Caliph Umar II for an undetermined period)
- Dahhak ibn Abd al-Rahman al-Ash'ari (undetermined period in 717–720; governed under Umar II)
- Abd Allah ibn Abd al-Rahman ibn Utba al-Fihri (undetermined period in 720–724; governed under Caliph Yazid II)
- Walid ibn Talid al-Murri (undetermined period in 720–732; governed under Yazid II and continued in office under Caliph Hisham ibn Abd al-Malik until being reassigned by the latter to Mosul in 732)
- Hakam ibn Walid ibn Yazid ibn Abd al-Malik (743–744; governed under his father Caliph al-Walid II)
  - Abd al-Samad ibn Muhammad ibn al-Hajjaj (743–744; a grandson of al-Hajjaj ibn Yusuf, governed as Hakam ibn Walid's lieutenant)

== Sources ==
- Blankinship, Khalid Yahya (1994). The End of the Jihâd State: The Reign of Hishām ibn ʻAbd al-Malik and the Collapse of the Umayyads. Albany, New York: State University of New York Press. ISBN 978-0-7914-1827-7.
- Crone, Patricia (1980). Slaves on Horses: The Evolution of the Islamic Polity. Cambridge: Cambridge University Press. ISBN 0-521-52940-9.
- Cobb, Paul M. (2001). White Banners: Contention in ‘Abbāsid Syria, 750–880. Albany, NY: State University of New York Press. ISBN 0-7914-4880-0.
- Gundelfinger, Simon; Verkinderen, Peter (2020). "The Governors of al-Sham and Fars in the Early Islamic Empire - A Comparative Regional Perspective". In Hagemann, Hannah-Lena; Heidemann, Stefan (eds.). Elites — Connecting the Early Islamic Empire. Berlin: Walter de Gruyter. pp. 255–330. ISBN 978-3-11-066648-9.
- Le Strange, Guy (1890). Palestine Under the Moslems: A Description of Syria and the Holy Land from A.D. 650 to 1500. London: Committee of the Palestine Exploration Fund. OCLC 1004386.
