= Al-Jahshiyari =

10th-century Abbasid official and scholar

Abū ʿAbdallāh Muḥammad ibn ʿAbdūs al-Jahshiyārī
- Born: Kufa
- Died: 942; Baghdad, Abbasid Caliphate
- Other names: Muhammad, Abu Abdallah
- Occupation: Abbasid official
- Years active: 908 – 940s
- Known for: Author of Kitab al-wuzara wa'l-kuttab (Book of Viziers and Scribes).
- Father: Abdūs

Abū ʿAbdallāh Muḥammad ibn ʿAbdūs al-Jahshiyārī (died 942) was a prominent Abbasid bureaucrat and scholar. He authored Kitab al-wuzara wa'l-kuttab (Book of Viziers and Scribes).

== Life ==
Al-Jahshiyari was born in Kufa, a center of scholarship in the Islamic world. He was called "al-Jahshiyari" after one of his father's employers, Abu'l-Hasan Ali ibn Jahshiyari, the hajib (grand chamberlain) of the Abbasid prince and commander-in-chief al-Muwaffaq (r. 870–891).

A katib (scribe of secretary), al-Jahshiyari became a top bureaucrat of the Abbasid Caliphate in the 10th century. He succeeded his father Abdus as the hajib of Ali ibn Isa ibn al-Jarrah, the vizier of Caliph al-Muqtadir (r. 908–929, 929–932) in 913–917. In 918 al-Jahshiyari led Ali ibn Isa's haras (personal guard) and afterward served as the hajib for Hamid ibn al-Abbas, who served as vizier in 918–923, though Ali ibn Isa continued to wield real power. Al-Jahshiyari's support for Ibn Muqla, a rival of Hamid's for the viziership, causing tensions with Hamid which may have been the reason he discontinued serving under him. Ibn Muqla became vizier in 928–930, 932, and 934–936, and al-Jahshiyari protected him when fell into disgrace. In 930 Ibn Muqla awarded al-Jahshiyari with the honor of transporting the kiswa, the black cloth used to cover the Kaaba in Mecca, during the Hajj (pilgrimage to Mecca) from Iraq that year. Five or six years later Ibn Muqla gifted him 200,000 dinars, according to the 13th-century historian Ibn al-Athir. His frequent involvement in court intrigues led to him being jailed and fined a number of times by unfriendly viziers and the amirs al-umara (commander of commanders) Ibn Ra'iq (r. 936–938, 941–942) and Bajkam (r. 938–941).

Al-Jahshiyari died in political obscurity in the Abbasid capital, Baghdad.

== Works ==
Al-Jahshiyari authored Kitab al-wuzara wa'l-kuttab (Book of Viziers and Scribes), a history of bureaucrats and administration. The book, (whose English rendition has started appearing in a blog titled English Translation of al-Jahshiyārī’s Kitāb al-Wuzarāʾ wa-l-Kuttāb), originally covered the period until 908 CE, but in its surviving form it ends with the reign of Caliph al-Mahdi (r. 745–785). He also authored a no longer extant chronicle of the Caliph al-Muqtadir (r. 908–932). The book honors the bureaucrats of the Caliphate, offering special praise for the Barmakids, a prominent family of viziers of the Abbasid caliphs, and is highly critical of their rivals, the Banu al-Furat. According to the historian Hugh N. Kennedy, al-Jahshiyari's view of the first century of Abbasid rule (750–850) is one of court intrigues, with "friendship, hatred and jealousy ... the main motive forces of his characters".

== Bibliography ==
- Bray, Julia (2019). Stories of Piety and Prayer, Deliverance Follows Adversity: Al-Muḥassin ibn ʿAlī al-Tanūkhī. New York: New York University Press. ISBN 978-1-479855-96-4.
- Kennedy, Hugh (2016) [1981]. The Early Abbasid Caliphate: A Political History (Reprint ed.). Abingdon, Oxon: Routledge (original publisher: Croom Helm). ISBN 978-1-138-95321-5.
- Osti, Letizia (2013). "Culture, Education and the Court". In van Berkel, Maaike; El Cheikh, Nadia Maria; Kennedy, Hugh; Osti, Letizia (eds.). Crisis and Continuity at the Abbasid Court: Formal and Informal Politics in the Caliphate of al-Muqtadir (295-320/908-32). Leiden: Brill. pp. 187–214. ISBN 978-90-04-25271-4.
- Stasolla, Maria Giovanna (2012). "How a Tenth-Century Learned Man Reads History: Al-Jahshiyari and the Barmakids". Eurasian Studies. 10 (1–2): 221–23.
