= Udhruh =

Udhruh اذرح Adhruh, Adroa, Augustopolis
- Town
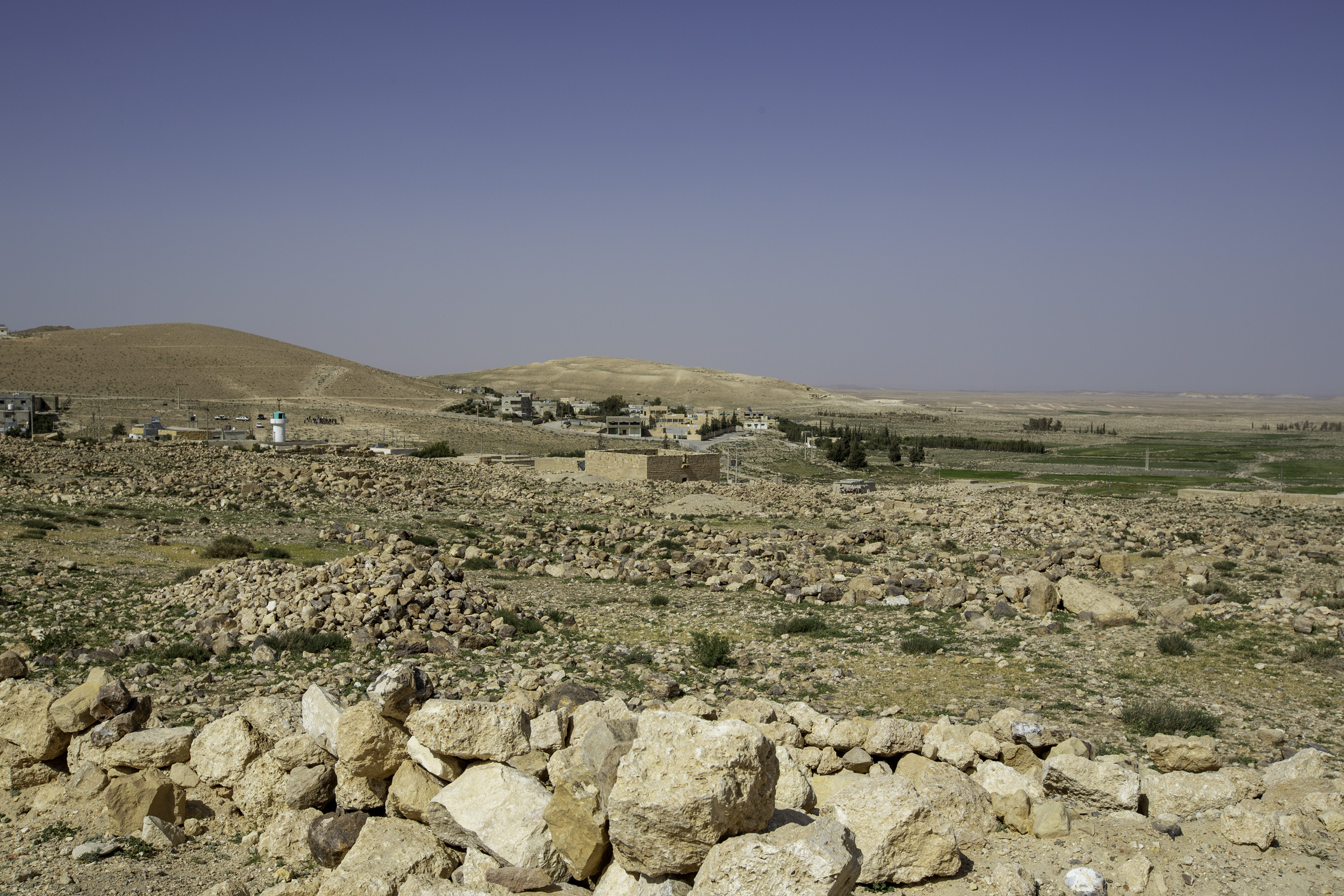
- Udhruh

- Location in Jordan
- Coordinates: 30°19′41″N 35°35′55″E
- Country: Jordan
- Governorate: Ma'an
- Subdistrict: Udhruh

Population (2015)
  - Total: 1,700
- Time zone: GMT +2
  - Summer (DST): +3

Udhruh (Arabic: اذرح; transliteration: Udhruḥ, Ancient Greek Adrou, Άδρου), also spelled Adhruh, is a town in southern Jordan, administratively part of the Ma'an Governorate. It is located 15 kilometers (9.3 mi) east of Petra. It is the center of the Udhruh Subdistrict. In 2015, the town had a population of 1,700 and the subdistrict had a population of 8,374.

Udhruh was inhabited by the Nabateans as early as the 1st century BCE and later became the site of a fortified Roman military camp used as the headquarters of Legio VI Ferrata. Udhruh continued to thrive and by the 6th century was one of the most prosperous towns in Palaestina Tertia. It submitted to the Islamic prophet Muhammad in 631. It later became the site of two decisive conferences in 658 and 661 that respectively arbitrated the end of the First Muslim Civil War and the onset of Muawiyah I's reign, and thus of the Umayyad Caliphate. As late as the 9th century it was the regional center of the Sharat district. During the Ottoman era a fort was built in the town. Udhruh was abandoned during this era and the modern settlement was founded in the late 1930s.

== History ==
Although the area surrounding Udhruh today is barren, archaeologists surmise that the site sat on a lush oasis during the early centuries of its settlement.

=== Nabateans and Romans ===
According to archaeological finds, Udhruh was a Nabatean settlement from at least the early 1st century BCE. Settlement in Udhruh peaked under the Nabatean king Aretas IV who reigned in ca. 9 BCE–40 CE. Thus, Udhruh developed concurrently with the Nabatean capital Petra.

Udhruh was the site of a Roman fort, which was likely built following the Roman annexation of the Nabatean Kingdom, clients of the Romans, in 106 CE. The fort may have been a continuation of a Nabatean military structure. In the late 3rd or early 4th century, the Legio VI Ferrata was headquartered at Udhruh. By then, the fort had long been looted and neglected and it was rebuilt in 303 or 304. By then the Romans (and later the Greek-Byzantines) referred to the settlement in the Notitia Dignitatum as " Augustopolis" (Αυγουστόπολις).

=== Byzantine period ===
Udhruh remained a place of some importance under Byzantine rule, which saw significant demolition and reconstruction of existing military structures in the town. The town passed to the control of the Byzantines' Arab federates, the Ghassanids, when Emperor Justinian I removed the legionnaires who manned the fortifications of the Limes Arabicus in 530. The Ghassanid phylarch al-Harith ibn Jabalah is credited with reconstructing Udhruh by the 10th-century historian Hamza al-Isfahani. In a 6th-century list of sites mostly located in the province of Palaestina Tertia, known as the Beersheba Edict, Udhruh was recorded as paying the second highest amount of taxes. This testifies to its significance as a regional center at the time, according to archaeologist Burton MacDonald. A church was built outside of the town's walls in between the 5th or early 7th century.

=== Muslim conquest ===
During the late Byzantine period, Adhruh was a possession of the Banu Judham tribe. It was often visited by the trade caravans of the Meccan tribe of Quraysh. When the Islamic prophet Muhammad, who belonged to the Quraysh, launched his expedition to Tabuk in 631, he obtained the capitulation of Udhruh's inhabitants in a treaty. The town held a strategic position overlooking the road between Arabia and the Balqa region and controlling access to the iron ore mines of Wadi Musa. The Byzantines did not maintain a garrison in Udhruh, but were still able to operate in the area during the Muslim conquest of the Levant launched under Caliph Abu Bakr (r. 632–634).

=== Early Muslim period ===
Many of the inhabitants of Udhruh were Jewish at the time of their submission to the Muslims, but subsequently converted to Islam. They were thenceforth referred to as mawali (associates) of the Banu Hashim. Udhruh also maintained its Christian community well into the early Islamic era. Peake suggested that Jews from Udhruh (as well as Maqna and Jarba) may have resettled in Petra, converted to Islam, and their descendants now comprise the Bedul Bedouin.

Udhruh gained fame in Islamic history for hosting the summit that arbitrated the end of the First Muslim Civil War between Caliph Ali (r. 656–661) and his opponents in 658. The first Umayyad caliph Muawiyah I, gained the recognition of his rival for leadership and son of Ali, Hasan ibn Ali in Udhruh. The town was the administrative center of Jund al-Sharah district of the southern Levant at least during the 9th century. The 10th-century geographer al-Muqaddasi notes that Udhruh's townspeople possessed a mantle of the prophet Muhammad and the treaty of capitulation they signed with him which was written on an animal skin.

=== Ottoman period ===
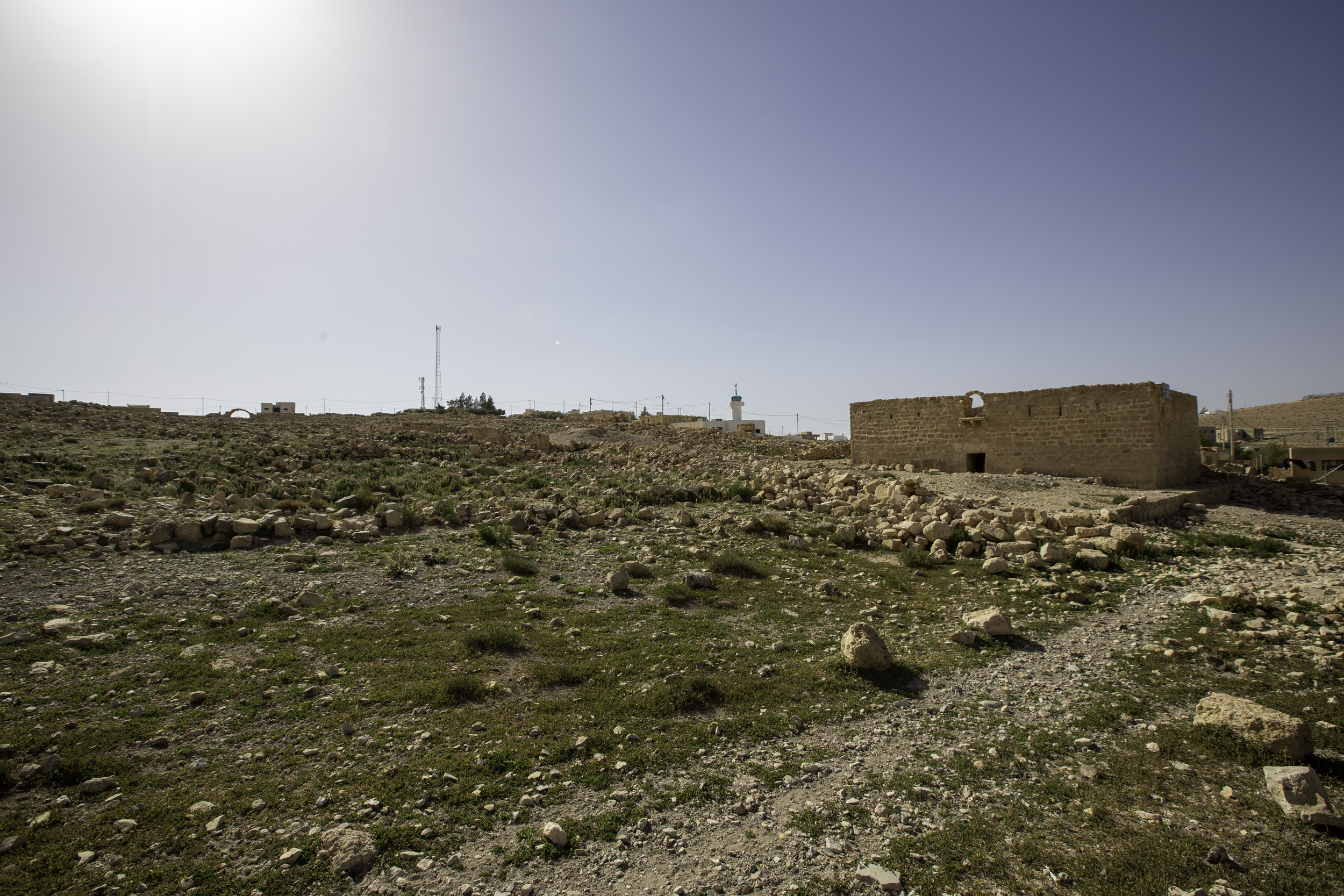
Ottoman Fort, Udhruh

At an unknown date during the Ottoman era (1517–1917), a fort was built in Udhruh. It had the roughly the same dimensions and design of the Ottoman fort in Ma'an, which was built in 1559. Archaeologist Andrew Petersen estimates that it was constructed by a local leader rather than the Ottoman government.

The site was abandoned at some point during the Ottoman era.

=== Modern period ===
The modern desert village of Udhruh was established in the late 1930s under the Emirate of Transjordan, a British protectorate that later became the modern-day Kingdom of Jordan.

== Geography ==
Udhruh is situated on the eastern edge of the Sharat highlands of southern Jordan. It has an average elevation of 1,200 kilometers (750 mi) above sea level. The town straddles the country's Desert Highway, and is located 20 kilometers (12 mi) northwest of the governorate capital, Ma'an, 13.5 kilometers (8.4 mi) east of Petra and Wadi Musa, and 120 kilometers (75 mi) north of Aqaba.

The climate is generally arid, with the lower-lying western part of town having average rainfall of 150–200 millimeters (5.9–7.9 in). and the higher eastern part seeing 50–100 millimeters (2.0–3.9 in). The months of January and February sometimes see heavy downpours that cause erosive gullies. The general lack of rainfall is compensated by Udhruh's spring. Average temperatures in Udhruh range from 10–15 Celsius in the winter and 30–35 Celsius in the summer.

== See also ==
- History of the Hajj: Ottoman period for forts similar to the one in Udhruh

== Bibliography ==
- Bisheh, Ghazi (2000). "Roman Legionary Camps and City Planning". The Umayyads: The Rise of Islamic Art. Arab Institute for Research and Publishing. ISBN 1-874044-35-X.
- Driessen, Mark; Abudanah, Fawzi (2018). "The Udhruh Region: A Green Desert in the Hinterland of Ancient Petra". In Zhuang, Yijie; Altaweel, Mark (eds.). Water Societies and Technologies from the Past and Present. London: UCL Press. ISBN 978-1-911576-71-6.
- Humphrey, John H. (2002). The Roman and Byzantine Near East: Late-Antique Petra, Nile Festival Building at Sepphoris, Deir Qalʻa Monastery, Khirbet Qana Village and Pilgrim Site, ʻAin-ʻArrub Hiding Complex and Other Studies. Journal of Roman Archaeology. ISBN 1887829490.
- Lammens, H. & Vaglieri, L. Veccia (1960). "Adhruḥ". In Gibb, H. A. R.; Kramers, J. H.; Lévi-Provençal, E.; Schacht, J.; Lewis, B. & Pellat, Ch. (eds.). The Encyclopaedia of Islam, Second Edition. Volume I: A–B. Leiden: E. J. Brill. p. 194. OCLC 495469456.
- Kaegi, Walter E. (1992). Byzantium and the Early Islamic Conquests. Cambridge: Cambridge University Press. ISBN 0-521-41172-6.
- MacDonald, Burton (2015). The Southern Transjordan Edomite Plateau and the Dead Sea Rift Valley: The Bronze Age to the Islamic Period (3800/3700 BC AD 1917). Oxford: Oxbow Books. ISBN 978-1-78297-832-9.
- Shahid, Irfan (2002). Byzantium and the Arabs in the Sixth Century: Volume 2, Part : Toponmy, Monuments and Historic Geography and Frontier Studies. Washington, D. C.: Dumbarton Oaks Research Library and Collection. ISBN 0-88402-284-6.
