= Mudrik ibn al-Muhallab =

Arab Commander of Umayyad Caliphate

Mudrik ibn al-Muhallab ibn Abī Ṣufra (Arabic: مدرك بن المهلب بن أبي صفرة) was an Arab commander of the Umayyad Caliphate during the reigns of caliphs Abd al-Malik (r. 685–705) and Sulayman (r. 715–717). During the nine-month-long governorship of his brother al-Mufaddal over Khurasan, Mudrik, who was headquartered in Balkh, was appointed alongside Uthman ibn Mas'ud as joint commander of an expedition against the rebel general Musa ibn Abd Allah ibn Khazim of Tirmidh. Mudrik was assigned to ensure the loyalty of Uthman and his largely Tamimi troops, due to his previous maltreatment by al-Mufaddal's father and brother, al-Muhallab ibn Abi Sufra and Yazid, respectively. Mudrik and Uthman secured alliances with the non-Muslim principalities surrounding Tirmidh and defeated Musa's forces, a task which had eluded many of al-Mufaddal's predecessors. After Musa was killed on the battlefield, his nephew Nadr ibn Sulayman ibn Abd Allah agreed to surrender Tirmidh only to Mudrik, not Uthman and the former allowed him to leave the fortress unharmed. The Muhallabids, the family to which Mudrik belonged, were dismissed and harassed by al-Hajjaj ibn Yusuf during the reign of Caliph al-Walid I (r. 705–715), but with the accession of the latter's brother, Caliph Sulayman, in 715, the family's fortunes were revived. Yazid ibn al-Muhallab was made governor over Iraq, Khurasan and the eastern half of the Caliphate and appointed Mudrik as his first lieutenant governor over Sijistan (Sistan). He was later replaced by Yazid's son Mu'awiya.

== Bibliography ==
- Crone, Patricia (1980). Slaves on Horses: The Evolution of the Islamic Polity. Cambridge: Cambridge University Press. ISBN 0-521-52940-9.
- Hinds, Martin, ed. (1990). The History of al-Ṭabarī, Volume XXIII: The Zenith of the Marwānid House: The Last Years of ʿAbd al-Malik and the Caliphate of al-Walīd, A.D. 700–715/A.H. 81–95. SUNY Series in Near Eastern Studies. Albany, New York: State University of New York Press. ISBN 978-0-88706-721-1.
- Shaban, M. A. (1970). The Abbasid Revolution. Cambridge University Press. ISBN 0-521-29534-3.
