= Habib ibn al-Muhallab =

Umayyad Provincial governor and Military commander

Governor of al-Sind
- In office 715–717
- Monarch: Sulayman
- Preceded by: Yazid ibn Abi Kabsha al-Saksaki
- Succeeded by: Abd al-Malik ibn Misma

Personal details
- Died: 720 al-Aqr, Iraq
- Relations: Niftawayh (descendant)
- Parent: Al-Muhallab ibn Abi Sufra
- Military career
- Allegiance: Umayyad Caliphate
- Branch: Umayyad army
- Service years: 686–720
- Rank: Commander

Habib ibn al-Muhallab al-Azdi (Arabic: حبيب بن المهلب الأزدي) (died 720) was an Umayyad provincial governor and military commander, and a member of the Muhallabid family. He later participated in the revolt of his brother Yazid ibn al-Muhallab and was killed in the Battle of al-Aqr.

== Career ==
Habib was a son of the general al-Muhallab ibn Abi Sufra, under whom he served during his early career. In 686 and again in 695 he is recorded as having participated in his father's campaigns to eradicate the Azraqite rebels in the districts of Basra, Ahwaz and Fars. After operations against the Azraqites were concluded in 697, Habib moved to Khurasan, where al-Muhallab had been appointed as governor by al-Hajjaj ibn Yusuf. Three years later he took part in al-Muhallab's expedition against Kish. During this campaign, he was selected to lead a raid against Rabinjan, but he decided to withdraw after the lord of Bukhara advanced against him.

When al-Muhallab died in 702, Habib was present to receive his father's testament; afterwards he took command of the army and brought it to his younger brother Yazid, who was recognized by al-Hajjaj as the new governor of Khurasan. Habib spent the next few years assisting Yazid and, after the latter's dismissal in 704, his successor al-Mufaddal. During this period he was appointed as deputy governor of Kirman, a position which he retained until al-Hajjaj dismissed all of the Muhallabids from their positions. Following this, he was detained in Basra on the orders of al-Hajjaj and tortured, but was spared from any further punishment when the caliph al-Walid ordered that the Muhallabids be granted safe-conduct.

As a result of the death of al-Walid and the accession of caliph Sulayman in 715, the Muhallabids were returned to power, and Yazid was appointed by the caliph to al-Hajjaj's old position as governor of Iraq. At the same time, Habib was appointed to the province of Sind, which had recently been conquered by Muhammad ibn Qasim, and was ordered to continue the military campaign there. Upon arriving in the province, Habib set up camp on the bank of the Indus and received the submission of the people of al-Rur. During his governorship, he fought and defeated an unnamed tribe, but no major territorial gains were recorded.

Habib remained in Sind for the duration of Sulayman's caliphate. After Sulayman's death in 717, however, the Muhallabids again suffered a reversal of fortune; the new caliph Umar ibn Abd al-Aziz decided to dismiss Yazid from Iraq and threw him into prison. Habib's governorship also came to an end; he departed from al-Sind and eventually returned to Basra.

== Revolt of Yazid ibn al-Muhallab ==
The caliph Umar died in February 720; around the same time, Yazid escaped from his imprisonment and decided to return to Iraq. Habib at this time was in Basra, together with his brothers al-Mufaddal, Marwan and Abd al-Malik. When news of Yazid's escape reached Basra, the city's governor Adi ibn Artah al-Fazari ordered the arrest of the Muhallabids as a precautionary measure. Shortly after this, however, Yazid arrived before Basra with an army and was able to seize control of the city. Once the city's defenders were defeated and the governor was captured, Habib and his brothers were released from prison and they joined Yazid's rebellion against the caliph.

Over the course of the next several months, Habib remained with Yazid as the latter consolidated his position in Iraq. When news arrived that an army under the command of Maslama ibn Abd al-Malik was advancing from Syria, Habib advised his brother to either retreat to Fars, where he could set up a secure stronghold in the mountains, or to send some of his forces to the Jazira and engage the enemy there; Yazid, however, rejected both of these proposals and insisted on remaining in Iraq. When the Umayyad and Muhallabid armies met at al-Aqr in August 720, Habib was put in command of the right flank of his brother's forces. He was killed during the resulting battle, shortly before the death of Yazid himself.

== Notes ==
Preceded by Yazid ibn Abi Kabsha al-Saksaki	Governor of al-Sind; 715–717	Succeeded by Abd al-Malik ibn Misma
