= Al-Mufaddal ibn al-Muhallab =

Umayyad commander and Khurasan governor

Al-Mufaddal ibn al-Muhallab al-Azdi (Arabic: المفضل بن المهلب الازدي; died 720) was an Umayyad commander and governor of Khurasan in 704/705, during which he conquered Badghis and asserted caliphal control of the rebel-held fortress of Tirmidh. He later became the chief deputy of his brother Yazid ibn al-Muhallab during the latter's revolt against the Umayyads in Iraq. He became head of the Muhallabid family when Yazid was slain but was pursued and soon after killed by Umayyad forces.

== Life ==
Al-Mufaddal was a son of al-Muhallab ibn Abi Sufra of the Azd tribe, who was the leading general in the Iraqi wars against the Azariqa Kharijites in 683–698 and governor of Khurasan in 698–704. Al-Mufaddal's mother was an Indian woman named Bahla or Bahalla. His half-brother, Yazid ibn al-Muhallab, succeeded their father as governor of Khurasan after his death in 702. Al-Mufaddal was Yazid's field commander when they engaged and defeated the rebels of Ibn al-Ash'ath's abortive revolt against the Umayyads in Iraq when they fled and set up base in Khurasan.

When the latter was dismissed by the Umayyad viceroy of Iraq and the eastern Caliphate, al-Hajjaj ibn Yusuf, al-Mufaddal was installed in his place. He served for nine months, during which he asserted Arab rule over the areas of Badghis, Akharun and Shuman in Khurasan. He also dislodged and killed the independent Arab ruler of Tirmidh, Musa ibn Abdallah ibn Khazim al-Sulami.

Al-Hajjaj dismissed and imprisoned al-Mufaddal with Yazid and their brothers Habib and Abd al-Malik. They all escaped in 708 or 709 and found asylum with the Umayyad prince and governor of Palestine. Yazid was made governor of Iraq and Khurasan by Sulayman in 715, but was dismissed and imprisoned again by his successor, Caliph Umar II, in 717. When the latter died in 720, Yazid escaped and attempted to reestablish himself in the family stronghold of Basra. There the governor Adi ibn Artat al-Fazari imprisoned al-Mufaddal, Abd al-Malik and Habib as hostages.

Yazid took the city and freed his brothers and afterward rallied an Iraqi revolt against the Umayyads. Al-Mufaddal was Yazid's main lieutenant as the Muhallabids advanced on Wasit and toward Kufa. The Umayyad army of Maslama ibn Abd al-Malik defeated and killed Yazid, causing al-Mufaddal to retreat to Basra where he was chosen as the Muhallabid family's new head. He led them by boat to Kerman where reports vary as to the place of his slaying by pro-Umayyad forces, including at Kerman, Qandabil, and Sistan.

== Bibliography ==
- Hinds, Martin, ed. (1990). The History of al-Ṭabarī, Volume XXIII: The Zenith of the Marwānid House: The Last Years of ʿAbd al-Malik and the Caliphate of al-Walīd, A.D. 700–715/A.H. 81–95. SUNY Series in Near Eastern Studies. Albany, New York: State University of New York Press. ISBN 978-0-88706-721-1.
- Ulrich, Brian (2019). Arabs in the Early Islamic Empire: Exploring al-Azd Tribal Identity. Edinburgh: Edinburgh University Press. ISBN 978-1-4744-3682-3.
