= Umm al-Hajjaj bint Muhammad =

Wife of Umayyad caliph Yazid II and al-Walid II's mother

Umm al-Hajjaj bint Muhammad أم الحجاج بنت محمد

Consort of the Umayyad caliph
- Tenure: 720 – 722/24
- Born: 700s Taif, Umayyad Caliphate
- Died: Damascus, Umayyad Caliphate
- Spouse: Yazid ibn Abd al-Malik
- Children: al-Hajjaj ibn Yazid; al-Walid ibn Yazid
Names
- Umm al-Hajjaj bint Muhammad ibn Yusuf al-Thaqafi
- House: Banu Thaqif (by birth); Umayyad (by marriage)
- Father: Muhammad ibn Yusuf al-Thaqafi
- Mother: Hind bint Al-Nu'man Al-Khazraji
- Religion: Islam

Umm al-Hajjaj bint Muhammad (Arabic: أم الحجاج بنت محمد) was the famous principal wife of the ninth Umayyad caliph Yazid II and mother of eleventh Umayyad caliph Al-Walid II.

== Biography ==
Her full name was Umm al-Hajjaj bint Muhammad ibn Yusuf al-Thaqafi, she belonged to Thaqafi tribe.

Yazid established marital ties to the family of al-Hajjaj ibn Yusuf (d. 714), the powerful viceroy of Iraq for his father, Caliph Abd al-Malik, and brother, al-Walid I (r. 705–715). He married al-Hajjaj's niece, Umm al-Hajjaj, the daughter of Muhammad ibn Yusuf al-Thaqafi. During her uncle's lifetime, she gave birth to Yazid's sons: al-Hajjaj, who died young, and al-Walid II, who became caliph in 743.

Umm al-Hajjaj became very influential wife of Yazid II. Her second son al-Walid, who was born in 709, was considered a candidate to the Caliphate throne.

Her husband, Yazid II died of tuberculosis in Irbid, a town in the Balqa subdistrict of Jund Dimashq (the military division of Damascus corresponding to Transjordan) on 24 Sha'ban 105 AH (26 January 724). His son al-Walid or half-brother Hisham led his funeral prayers. Yazid had intended to appoint al-Walid as his immediate successor but was persuaded by Maslama ibn Abd al-Malik to appoint Hisham ibn Abd al-Malik, followed by al-Walid.

Umm al-Hajjaj died during her husband reign or during her reign of brother-in law Hisham.

== Source ==
- Powers, David S., ed. (1989). The History of al-Ṭabarī, Volume XXIV: The Empire in Transition: The Caliphates of Sulaymān, ʿUmar, and Yazīd, A.D. 715–724/A.H. 96–105. SUNY Series in Near Eastern Studies. Albany, New York: State University of New York Press. ISBN 978-0-7914-0072-2.
- Wellhausen, Julius (1927). The Arab Kingdom and Its Fall. Translated by Margaret Graham Weir. Calcutta: University of Calcutta.
- Pellat, Ch. (1971). "Ḥabãba". In Lewis, B.; Ménage, V. L.; Pellat, Ch. & Schacht, J. (eds.). The Encyclopaedia of Islam, Second Edition. Volume III: H–Iram. Leiden: E. J. Brill. p. 2. OCLC 495469525.
- Blankinship, Khalid Yahya, ed. (1989). The History of al-Ṭabarī, Volume XXV: The End of Expansion: The Caliphate of Hishām, A.D. 724–738/A.H. 105–120. SUNY Series in Near Eastern Studies. Albany, New York: State University of New York Press. ISBN 978-0-88706-569-9.
- Lammens, H. & Blankinship, Kh. Y. (2002). "Yazīd (II) b. ʿAbd al-Malik". In Bearman, P. J.; Bianquis, Th.; Bosworth, C. E.; van Donzel, E. & Heinrichs, W. P. (eds.). The Encyclopaedia of Islam, Second Edition. Volume XI: W–Z. Leiden: E. J. Brill. p. 311. ISBN 978-90-04-12756-2.
