= Ismail ibn Ubayd Allah ibn Abi al-Muhajir =

Governor of North Africa under the Umayyad Caliphate

Ismail ibn Ubayd Allah ibn Abi al-Muhajir إسماعيل بن عبيد الله بن أبي المهاجر

Governor of Ifriqiya
- In office 718–720
- Monarch: Umar II
- Preceded by: Muhammad ibn Yazid
- Succeeded by: Yazid ibn Abi Muslim

Personal details
- Born: 683
- Died: 754

Military service
- Allegiance: Umayyad Caliphate

Ismail ibn Ubayd Allah ibn Abi al-Muhajir (Arabic: إسماعيل بن عبيد الله بن أبي المهاجر) was an Umayyad governor of Ifriqiya (North Africa) from 718 to 720.

Ismail ibn Ubayd Allah ibn Abi al-Muhajir (or al-Muhajjar) was from a client tribe of the Quraysh.

In 718, Ismail ibn Ubayd Allah was appointed by Caliph Umar bin AbdulAziz or Umar II to replace his predecessor's appointee, the unpopular Muhammad bin Yazid. Ismail was one of the new crop of Umar II's competent governors, with instructions to improve the Kairouan administration and pursue the integration of non-Arab Muslims into the empire, rather than treat them as conquered peoples. As such, Ismail encouraged conversions among the Berbers of North Africa and curbed the abuses of the Arab military caste. Ismail adhered to Islamic law and eliminated extraordinary taxes and slave-tributes on Berber populations. He is credited for completing the conversion of the Berber population to Islam.

In a curious note, Ismail was the first and only Umayyad governor of Ifriqiya who was not given supervisory authority over Iberia (al-Andalus). In an unusual step, Caliph Umar II decided to appoint Al-Samh bin Malik al-Khawlani as the governor of al-Andalus directly, and made him directly answerable to Damascus, rather than going through Kairouan.

Ismail's tenure was competent but short. He was relieved of his post in 720 by Umar II's successor, Caliph Yazid II and replaced by the dubious Yazid bin Abi Muslim as governor in Kairouan.

== See also ==
- History of early Islamic Tunisia
- History of medieval Tunisia

| Preceded by Muhammad ibn Yazid | Governor of Ifriqiya; 718–720 | Succeeded by Yazid ibn Abi Muslim |
