= Rabinjan =

Medieval town in Transoxiana

Map of Rabinjan in the tenth century

Rabinjan or Arbinjan (Arabic: ربنجن، أربنجن) was a medieval town in the region of Transoxiana, between the cities of Samarkand and Bukhara. It was located in the vicinity of the present-day Kattakurgan.

== Geography ==
The Muslim geographers described Rabinjan as a town of Sughd and a dependency of Samarkand. It was one of the settlements on the Samarkand-Bukhara road, lying between Zarman to the east and Dabusiyya to the west, and was located to the south of the Sughd River. Ibn Khurradadhbih described the town as being twelve farsakhs from Samarkand and twenty-seven from Bukhara; Qudama, on the other hand, considered it to be thirteen farsakhs from Samarkand and twenty-four from Bukhara. Al-Istakhri added that it was two farsakhs from al-Kushaniya.

== History ==
The site of Rabinjan was settled almost two thousand years ago. In the pre-Islamic history of the town, it was considered as one of the settlements of Sogdiana. During this period there may have been a Christian presence in the town, as a ceramic cast for molding crosses was recovered from the area.

During the Muslim conquest of Transoxiana, Rabinjan was subjected to attacks by the Arabs. In 699 Habib ibn al-Muhallab undertook a raid against it, but he was opposed by an army led by the lord of Bukhara and decided to withdraw. It was during the campaigns of Qutayba ibn Muslim (705–715) that Rabinjan was conquered by the Muslims. In 712 the town was the scene of a skirmish between the armies of Qutayba and Ghurak, the Sogdian prince of Samarkand; the Muslims won the engagement and they were able to continue their advance to Samarkand.

After its conquest, Rabinjan shared the history of Muslim Sughd, and it was ruled successively by the Umayyads, Abbasids and Samanids. In the ninth and tenth centuries it was generally included by the Muslim geographers in their accounts of Transoxiana. Al-Muqaddasi, writing in the late tenth century, recorded that Rabinjan produced a number of goods, including winter shawls, dried dates, metal drinking cups, ropes made of hemp, and sulfur. Other writers noted that it was also known for its saddlecloths and production of tin bronze.

Following the downfall of the Samanids in the late eleventh century, Rabinjan became a possession of the western Qarakhanids. In 1158 the town was destroyed during the Khwarazm-Shah Il-Arslan's invasion of Transoxiana.
