= Yazid ibn Abi Kabsha al-Saksaki =

Umayyad Provincial governor and Commander

Umayyad Sahib al-Shurta
- Monarch: Abd al-Malik

Umayyad Governor of Iraq
- In office 714–715
- Monarch: Al-Walid I
- Preceded by: Al-Hajjaj ibn Yusuf al-Thaqafi
- Succeeded by: Yazid ibn al-Muhallab

Umayyad Governor of Sind
- In office 18 July 715 – 715
- Monarch: Sulayman
- Preceded by: Muhammad ibn Qasim al-Thaqafi
- Succeeded by: Habib ibn al-Muhallab al-Azdi

Personal details
- Died: 715; Sind
- Parent: Haywil ibn Yasar
- Relatives: Ziyad (brother); Sari ibn Ziyad (nephew)

Military service
- Rank: Commander
- Battles/wars: Campaign against the Kharijites (698); Campaign against the Byzantine Empire (712/3)

Yazid ibn Abi Kabsha al-Saksaki (Arabic: يزيد بن أبي كبشة السكسكي) was an Arab military commander and provincial governor for the Umayyad Caliphate.

He was the son of Haywil ibn Yasar, surnamed Abu Kabsha, a member of the Syrian tribal nobility and an adherent of the Umayyads during the Second Fitna. Yazid served as sahib al-shurta for Caliph Abd al-Malik ibn Marwan (r. 685–705), campaigned against the Kharijites in Iraq in 698, and was appointed by the governor of Iraq, al-Hajjaj ibn Yusuf, as head of his shurta in Wasit. In 712/3 he led a campaign against the Byzantine Empire, and after the death of Hajjaj in 714, he succeeded him briefly as governor of Iraq. Caliph Sulayman ibn Abd al-Malik (r. 715–717) then sent him to Sind, where he dismissed and imprisoned the incumbent governor, Muhammad ibn Qasim. Yazid died in Sind shortly after his arrival there.

He had a brother Ziyad, of whom nothing is known, but his nephew Sari ibn Ziyad was among the pro-Yemeni leaders during the Third Fitna.

== Sources ==
- Crone, Patricia (1980). Slaves on horses: the evolution of the Islamic polity. Cambridge and New York: Cambridge University Press. ISBN 0-521-52940-9.

Preceded by al-Hajjaj ibn Yusuf al-Thaqafi	Governor of Iraq; 714–715	Succeeded by Yazid ibn al-Muhallab al-Azdi
Preceded by Muhammad ibn Qasim al-Thaqafi	Governor of Sind; 715	Succeeded by Habib ibn al-Muhallab al-Azdi
