= Al-Walid II =

Umayyad caliph from 743 to 744

Al-Walid II الْوَلِيد بْنِ يَزِيد
- Amir al-Mu'minin
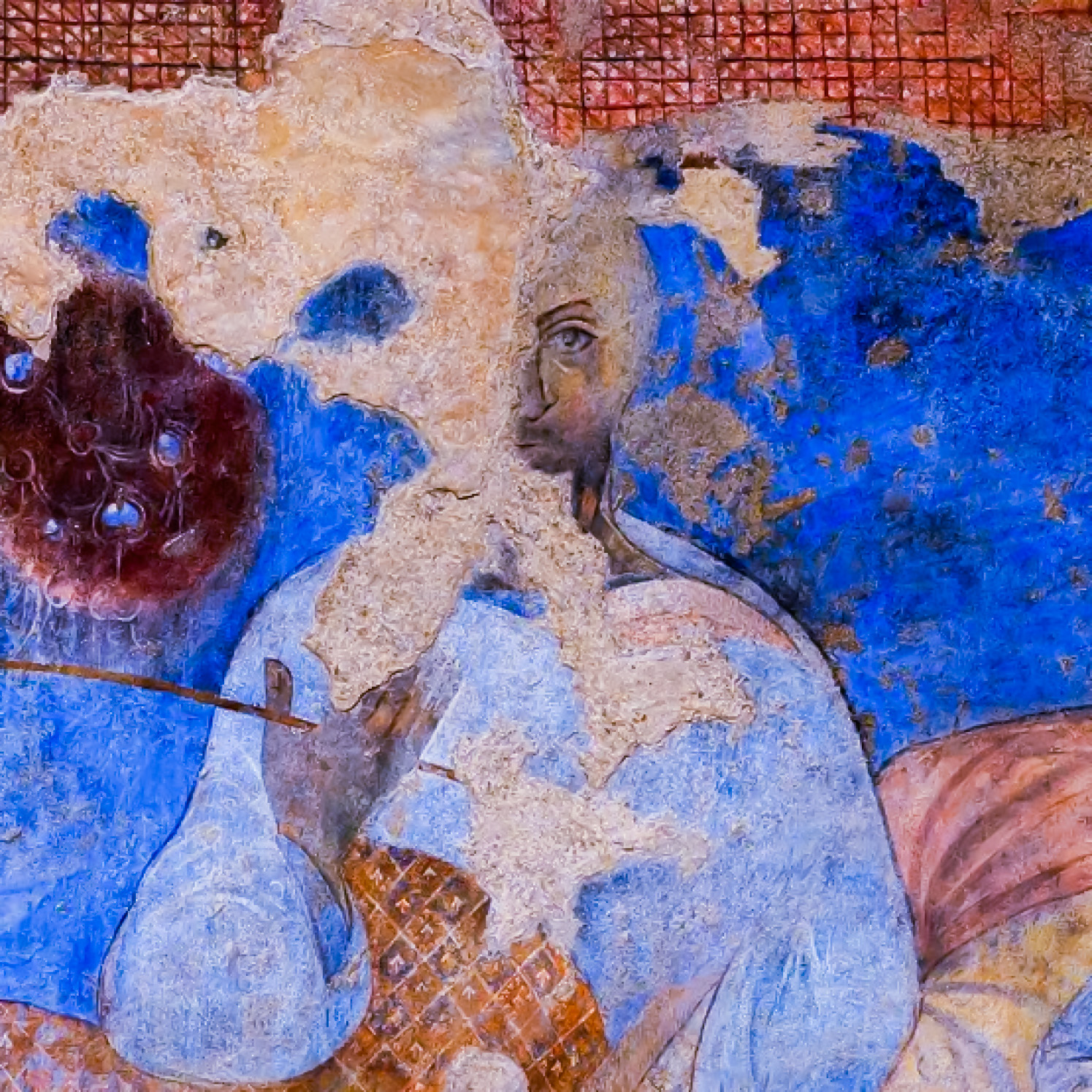
- Umayyad fresco of Prince (future caliph) Walid bin Yazid

11th Caliph of the Umayyad Caliphate
- Reign: 6 February 743 – 17 April 744 (1 year)
- Predecessor: Hisham ibn Abd al-Malik
- Successor: Yazid ibn al-Walid
- Born: c. 709; Syria, Umayyad Caliphate
- Died: 17 April 744 (aged 35); Al-Bakhra, Umayyad Caliphate (modern-day Syria)
- Cause of death: Killed in battle during a coup
- Spouses: Atika bint Uthman; Al-Nawwar
- Issue: Al-Hakam; Uthman
- House: Marwanid
- Dynasty: Umayyad
- Father: Yazid II
- Mother: Umm al-Hajjaj bint Muhammad
- Religion: Islam

Al-Walid ibn Yazid ibn Abd al-Malik (Arabic: الْوَلِيد بْنِ يَزِيد بْنِ عَبْدِ الْمَلِك, romanized: Al-Walīd ibn Yazīd ibn ʿAbd al-Malik; 709 – 17 April 744), commonly known as al-Walid II, was the eleventh Umayyad caliph, ruling from 743 until his assassination in 744. He succeeded his uncle, Hisham ibn Abd al-Malik.

== Birth and background ==
Al-Walid was the son of the ninth Umayyad caliph Yazid II and his wife Umm al-Hajjaj Zaynab bint Muhammad al-Thaqafi in 709. His mother was the daughter of Umayyad official Muhammad ibn Yusuf al-Thaqafi.

His father, Yazid II ruled the Caliphate from 720 to January 724. Yazid II died in Irbid in the Balqa (i.e. Transjordan) subdistrict of Jund Dimashq (military district of Damascus) on 26 Sha'ban 105 AH (28 January 724 CE). His son al-Walid or half-brother Hisham led his funeral prayers. Yazid had intended to appoint al-Walid as his immediate successor, but was persuaded by his brother Maslama to appoint Hisham instead, followed by al-Walid, who had been named second in the line of succession when he was aged 11 in 720 CE.

== Early life ==
As al-Walid grew older, Hisham initially regarded his young nephew with some affection, but grew increasingly disillusioned by his dissolute lifestyle. Consequently, Hisham reduced al-Walid's financial allowances and punished some of his undesirable associates. In response, al-Walid withdrew from the court and established himself in a remote desert residence, which may be the ruined site now known as Qasr Tuba in the Jordanian desert.

Following Hisham's accession, He attempted to secure Maslama ibn Hisham as his successor in place of the appointed successor, his predecessor's son al-Walid II. Hisham's initial attempts following the Hajj pilgrimage of 735 to persuade al-Walid to step down in favor of Maslama or give Maslama the oath of allegiance as al-Walid's successor were rejected by al-Walid. Afterward, Hisham sought to undermine al-Walid and secretly gathered support for Maslama. The latter's nomination was supported by his paternal uncle, the famous general Maslama ibn Abd al-Malik, Hisham's maternal grandfather, the former governor of Medina, Hisham ibn Isma'il al-Makhzumi, and his sons Ibrahim and Muhammad, and the sons of the influential Banu Abs chief of northern Syria, al-Qa'qa' ibn Khulayd. Maslama's mother Umm Hakim also lobbied for her son's succession. Opposed to Maslama's proposed succession was Khalid al-Qasri, the governor of Iraq, to which Maslama responded by insulting him and his dead brother Asad. Maslama ibn Abd al-Malik's death in the late 730s was a major setback to Hisham's succession plans as it represented the loss of the plan's key supporter in the Umayyad dynasty. After Hisham's death he was succeeded by Al-Walid II in February 743.

== Accession ==
Hisham died in February 743 and his son Maslama led the funeral prayers. Al-Walid II acceded to the caliphate and immediately ordered that Hisham's sons at Rusafa, near Palmyra, be arrested by their cousin al-Abbas ibn al-Walid, but expressly forbade that Maslama or his household be disturbed in deference to their old companionship and Maslama's defense of al-Walid from Caliph Hisham.

== Caliphate ==
Al-Walid succeeded to the throne on the death of Hisham on 6 February 743. As heir, al-Walid was known for his open-handedness. As caliph, he took special care of the crippled and blind, increasing their stipend. He named his two sons, al-Hakam and Uthman, to succeed him in that order as documented by a letter dated 21 May 743 in al-Tabari. Al-Tabari also quotes a number of al-Walid's poems.

Al-Walid at first confirmed Nasr ibn Sayyar as governor of Khurasan. However, bribed by Yusuf ibn Umar, the caliph dismissed him. Al-Walid appointed his uncle Yusuf ibn Muhammad governor of Medina. At the same time, Yahya ibn Zayd, the son of Zayd ibn Ali, was found in Khurasan. Nasr urged him to present himself to the caliph, to maintain Islamic unity. However, Yahya chose another path and after initial victory was slain.

Al-Walid put Sulayman ibn Hisham in prison. Such a deed, as well as his reputed drinking, singing and immorality aroused opposition. Al-Walid was fond of versifying and he arranged horse races. The upright Yazid ibn al-Walid spoke against the new ruler's moral laxity. A group began plotting his assassination. When approached, Khalid ibn Abdallah al-Qasri declined to join in and even cautioned al-Walid. However, his vague warning aroused al-Walid's ire. He imprisoned Khalid and then gave him to Yusuf ibn Umar for fifty million dirhams. Yusuf tortured and killed Khalid. This intensely angered many of al-Walid's own relatives.

During the reign of al-Walid II, Yazid ibn al-Walid spoke out against al-Walid's "immorality" which included discrimination on behalf of the Qaysi Arabs against Yemenis and non-Arab Muslims, and Yazid received further support from the Qadariyyah and Murji'ah.

Hearing of the plot, Marwan ibn Muhammad wrote from Armenia urging a more prudent course of action, one more promising for the stability of the state and the preservation of the Umayyad house. This was disregarded and many armed men moved into Damascus.

== Death ==
Yazid slipped into Damascus and deposed al-Walid in a coup, following this up with a disbursement of funds from the treasury. The caliph was besieged in a castle outside the city. He fought well, but on April 16, 744, at Al-Aghdaf, in modern Jordan, he was defeated and killed by the forces of Sulayman ibn Hisham. He was succeeded by his cousin Yazid III.

According to Yazid's own account, Yazid sent Abd al-Aziz ibn al-Hajjaj to meet Al-Walid at al-Bakhra. 'Abd al-Aziz offered to set up a tribal assembly (shura) to decide the future of the realm. Al-Walid rejected this offer and attacked, by which action he lost his life.

== Family ==
One of Uthman ibn Muhammad ibn Abi Sufyan's daughters, Atika bint Uthman ibn Muhammad, was wed to the Umayyad caliph al-Walid II. Al-Walid had also as per custom taken two singers Shuhda and Al-Nawar as slave concubines.

Al-Walid II had two sons, al-Hakam and Uthman. He nominated them as his successors. After the victory and accession of Yazid III, the latter had Uthman and al-Hakam imprisoned.

== Bibliography ==
- Powers, David S., ed. (1989). The History of al-Ṭabarī, Volume XXIV: The Empire in Transition: The Caliphates of Sulaymān, ʿUmar, and Yazīd, A.D. 715–724/A.H. 96–105. SUNY Series in Near Eastern Studies. Albany, New York: State University of New York Press. ISBN 978-0-7914-0072-2.
- Blankinship, Khalid Yahya, ed. (1989). The History of al-Ṭabarī, Volume XXV: The End of Expansion: The Caliphate of Hishām, A.D. 724–738/A.H. 105–120. SUNY Series in Near Eastern Studies. Albany, New York: State University of New York Press. ISBN 978-0-88706-569-9.
- Glubb, Sir John, The Empire of the Arabs, Hodder and Stoughton, London, 1963
- Howard, I. K. A., ed. (1990). The History of al-Ṭabarī, Volume XIX: The Caliphate of Yazīd ibn Muʿāwiyah, A.D. 680–683/A.H. 60–64. SUNY Series in Near Eastern Studies. Albany, New York: State University of New York Press. ISBN 978-0-7914-0040-1.
- Robinson, Majied (2020). Marriage in the Tribe of Muhammad: A Statistical Study of Early Arabic Genealogical Literature. Berlin: Walter de Gruyter. ISBN 9783110624168.
- Marsham, Andrew (2009). The Rituals of Islamic Monarchy: Accession and Succession in the First Muslim Empire. Edinburgh: Edinburgh University Press. ISBN 978-0-7486-2512-3.
- Hillenbrand, Carole, ed. (1989). The History of al-Ṭabarī, Volume XXVI: The Waning of the Umayyad Caliphate: Prelude to Revolution, A.D. 738–744/A.H. 121–126. SUNY Series in Near Eastern Studies. Albany, New York: State University of New York Press. ISBN 978-0-88706-810-2.
- Bosworth, C. Edmund (1994). "Abū Ḥafṣ 'Umar al-Kirmānī and the Rise of the Barmakids". Bulletin of the School of Oriental and African Studies. 57 (2): 268–282. doi:10.1017/S0041977X0002485X. JSTOR 620573.
- Judd, Steven (July–September 2008). "Reinterpreting al-Walīd b. Yazīd". Journal of the American Oriental Society. 128 (3): 439–458. JSTOR 25608405.
- Bearman, P. J.; Bianquis, Th.; Bosworth, C. E.; van Donzel, E. & Heinrichs, W. P., eds. (2002). "Al-Walīd (II) b. Yazīd b. 'Abd al-Malik". The Encyclopaedia of Islam, Second Edition. Volume XI: W–Z. Leiden: E. J. Brill. p. 128. ISBN 978-90-04-12756-2.
- Hawting, G. R. (2002). The First Dynasty of Islam: The Umayyad Caliphate AD 661–750. Routledge. ISBN 978-1-134-55059-3.
- Ess, J. van (1978). "Ḳadariyya". In van Donzel, E.; Lewis, B.; Pellat, Ch. & Bosworth, C. E. (eds.). The Encyclopaedia of Islam, Second Edition. Volume IV: Iran–Kha. Leiden: E. J. Brill. pp. 376–380. ISBN 978-90-04-05745-6. OCLC 758278456.
- Crone, Patricia; Hinds, Martin (1986). God's Caliph - Religious Authority in the First Centuries of Islam. Cambridge: Cambridge University Press. ISBN 0-521-32185-9.
- Bernards, M.; Nawas, J.A. (2005). Patronate And Patronage in Early And Classical Islam. Brill. ISBN 978-90-04-14480-4.
- Hoyland, Robert G. (1997). Seeing Islam as Others Saw it: A Survey and Evaluation of Christian, Jewish, and Zoroastrian Writings on Early Islam. Darwin Press. ISBN 978-0-87850-125-0.

Al-Walid II Umayyad Dynasty Born: 709 Died: 17 April 744
Sunni Islam titles
Preceded by Hisham ibn Abd al-Malik	Caliph of Islam; Umayyad Caliph; 6 February 743 – 17 April 744	Succeeded by Yazid ibn al-Walid
