= Yazid ibn al-Muhallab =

Umayyad provincial governor (672–720)

Umayyad governor of Khurasan (Note: At the time, Khurasan was a sub-province of Iraq under al-Hajjaj ibn Yusuf)
- In office 702–704
- Monarchs: Abd al-Malik (r. 685–705)
- Preceded by: Al-Muhallab ibn Abi Sufra
- Succeeded by: Al-Mufaddal ibn al-Muhallab

Umayyad governor of Iraq (Note: The governorship of Iraq consisted of Kufa and Basra and their dependencies, Khurasan, Sijistan (Sistan) and Bahrayn)
- In office 715–717
- Monarch: Sulayman
- Preceded by: Yazid ibn Abi Kabsha al-Saksaki
- Succeeded by: Al-Jarrah ibn Abdallah al-Hakami (in Khurasan); Abd al-Hamid ibn Abd al-Rahman ibn Zayd ibn al-Khattab (in Kufa); Adi ibn Artat al-Fazari (in Basra)

Personal details
- Born: 672 or 673
- Died: 24 August 720 Aqr, near Babylon
- Children: Khalid; Mukhallad; Mu'awiya
- Parent(s): Al-Muhallab ibn Abi Sufra (father); Daughter of Sa'id or Yazid ibn Qabisa ibn Sarraq al-Azdi

Yazid ibn al-Muhallab al-Azdi (Arabic: يزيد بن المهلب, romanized: Yazīd ibn al-Muhallab al-Azdī; 672/673–24 August 720) was a commander and statesman for the Umayyad Caliphate in Iraq and Khurasan in the early 8th century. In 720, he led the last of a series of wide scale Iraqi rebellions against the Umayyads.

He succeeded his father, the prominent general al-Muhallab ibn Abi Sufra, as governor of Khurasan, in 702. In 704, Yazid was dismissed and imprisoned by the Umayyad viceroy al-Hajjaj ibn Yusuf. He escaped in c. 708–709 and gained asylum with the Umayyad prince Sulayman ibn Abd al-Malik in Palestine. When Sulayman acceded as caliph in 715, he appointed Yazid governor of Iraq. His authority was limited to military and religious affairs, with the provincial treasury headed by Salih ibn Abd al-Rahman, who restricted Yazid's lavish expenditures. The following year, Yazid's remit was extended to Khurasan, making him practical viceroy of the eastern half of the Caliphate. He adopted a partisan approach, persecuting al-Hajjaj's relatives and appointees and almost exclusively distributing power among the Yaman faction to which his tribe, the Azd, belonged, to the detriment of the rival Qays–Mudar faction. In 716, he led months-long military campaigns to conquer the Iranian principalities of the southern Caspian coast, which had eluded previous Arab armies. His initial success was reversed by an Iranian military alliance under Farrukhan the Great and he settled for a tributary arrangement.

When Sulayman died, Yazid was imprisoned by his successor, Caliph Umar II. Upon the latter's death in 720, Yazid escaped prison to avoid maltreatment by the next caliph, Yazid II, a relative of al-Hajjaj. He established himself in his family's stronghold of Basra, one of Iraq's chief capitals and garrisons, whereupon he declared holy war against the Umayyads and the Syrian troops on which their power rested. He gained a wide following in Basra and Iraq's other chief garrison, Kufa, with support across the tribal spectrum and among the religious and non-Arab (mawali) elements of the population. The rebellion was easily defeated by the Syrian army of the Umayyad general Maslama ibn Abd al-Malik. Yazid was slain and his Muhallabid family was hunted down, with many of their members killed. The near-elimination of the Muhallabids and the subsequent domination by the Qays–Mudar in Iraq and the east was a humiliation for the Yaman and revenge for the Muhallabids became a rallying cry amongst the Yamanis of Khurasan during the Abbasid Revolution which toppled the Umayyads in 750.

== Early life and career ==
Yazid was born in 672 or 673. His father, al-Muhallab ibn Abi Sufra, belonged to the Arab tribe of Azd, historically based in Oman but whose members established a significant presence in Basra, one of the two chief Arab garrison towns of Iraq in the mid to late 7th century; the other main garrison center and capital of Iraq was Kufa. Al-Muhallab's actual lineage from the Azd is disputed in the traditional sources, and his father, Abu Sufra, was most likely a Persian weaver or sailor who had been embraced by the Azd for his military prowess. Yazid's mother was a daughter of an Azdite, Sa'id (or Yazid) ibn Qabisa ibn Sarraq.

Al-Muhallab participated in the early Muslim conquests in Iran during the reigns of caliphs Umar (r. 634–644) and Uthman (r. 644–656) and in Sijistan under the Umayyad caliph Mu'awiya I (r. 661–680). After Umayyad rule collapsed in Iraq in 684, amid the Second Muslim Civil War, the Mecca-based counter-caliph Abd Allah ibn al-Zubayr gained recognition there and al-Muhallab served under Ibn al-Zubayr's brother, Mus'ab, who governed Iraq from Basra. During this period, al-Muhallab was the leading general in the Basran war efforts against the Azariqa Kharijites in Iran. Yazid began his military career fighting under his father during these campaigns. In 691 the Umayyads regained control of Iraq and kept al-Muhallab in his role against the Azariqa until he defeated them in 698.

== Governor of Khurasan ==
Watershed map of the Oxus River in the 8th century, showing Khurasan and Transoxiana

Yazid continued to serve under his father when he was appointed governor of Khurasan, the Caliphate's eastern frontier province, by the Umayyad viceroy of Iraq and the eastern caliphate ('the East'), al-Hajjaj ibn Yusuf, in 698. After the death of his brother al-Mughira ibn al-Muhallab, who had been in charge of Khurasan's fiscal affairs, Yazid was sent by his father to the provincial capital of Merv to tend to affairs, while his father was besieging the fortress of Kish in Transoxiana. Al-Muhallab died in 702 and al-Hajjaj appointed Yazid in his place. Neither al-Muhallab, nor Yazid effected any significant conquests during their tenures in Khurasan. After two years of struggle, al-Muhallab settled for a tributary agreement with Kish and withdrew to Merv, while Yazid is credited by the 8th-century historian al-Mada'ini for capturing a fortress in the Badghis area south of Merv from the Buddhist Hephtalite prince Nizak in 703 or 704.

Al-Muhallab and Yazid had refused entreaties by the Iraqi nobleman Ibn al-Ash'ath to join his revolt against al-Hajjaj and Umayyad rule in 700–701. When the revolt was suppressed by al-Hajjaj and his Syrian reinforcements, who were the military mainstay of the Umayyad caliphs, Yazid intercepted rebels who had escaped into Khurasan from Iraq. Taking a partisan approach to the rebels, he released those affiliated with the Yaman tribal-political faction to which his Azd tribe belonged, while sending those of the rival Qays–Mudar to al-Hajjaj for punishment.

=== Dismissal and imprisonment ===
Despite demonstrating loyalty, Yazid was dismissed by al-Hajjaj in 704, helping the latter firm up his authority over Khurasan. Al-Hajjaj was wary of Yazid due to his and his Muhallabid family's prestige and their power base among the Azd tribesmen, who were a major component of the troops in Basra and Khurasan. After the suppression of Ibn al-Ash'ath, the Muhallabids were "the last Iraqi family of major importance", according to the historian Martin Hinds. Yazid had refused several summons by al-Hajjaj to his seat at Wasit, but al-Hajjaj was able, after much persuasion, to obtain the dismissal order from Caliph Abd al-Malik (r. 685–705). Yazid reported to al-Hajjaj's summons in April or May 704; his initial replacement by al-Hajjaj, his brother al-Mufaddal ibn al-Muhallab, was dismissed after Yazid entered al-Hajjaj's custody and replaced with al-Hajjaj's protege Qutayba ibn Muslim. Concurrent with Yazid's dismissal and imprisonment, al-Hajjaj dismissed his brother Habib from the subgovernorship of Kerman and another brother, Abd al-Malik, as the head of his shurta (select troops).

== Asylum in Palestine ==
Yazid and his brothers were brought by al-Hajjaj to Rustuqabad in the Ahwaz district bordering Basra, where he was overseeing a campaign against the Kurds in 90 AH (708 or 709 CE). The Muhallabids managed to escape and reached a place near Basra, whereupon they headed toward Syria. They gained refuge in Palestine with their fellow Azd, who were a considerable component of the Arab tribal soldiery in the district, under the nobles Wuhayb ibn Abd al-Rahman and Sufyan ibn Sulaym. Both were retainers of the Umayyad prince and governor of Palestine, Sulayman ibn Abd al-Malik, the brother and successor-in-waiting to Caliph al-Walid I (r. 705–715). The Azd facilitated Yazid's asylum with Sulayman.

Sulayman paid the large fine Yazid owed to al-Hajjaj and interceded on his behalf with the caliph, who gave Yazid aman (safe conduct). According to the general narrative in the sources, Yazid was sent in chains to al-Walid's court in Damascus with Sulayman's son Ayyub and a letter from Sulayman requesting he respect the asylum he provided to Yazid. Al-Walid affirmed and instructed al-Hajjaj to end his pursuits against the Muhallabids.

For the length of time Yazid stayed with Sulayman in Palestine, al-Tabari provides the contradictory "nine months" and until al-Hajjaj died in July 714, while the version of Ibn Kathir clarifies that he remained until al-Hajjaj died. The historian Julius Wellhausen notes that Sulayman "came completely under his influence and let himself be still more prejudiced by him against Hajjâj", who backed al-Walid's unsuccessful efforts to replace Sulayman with his own son, Abd al-Aziz ibn al-Walid, in the line of succession.

== Viceroy of the East ==
Sulayman acceded upon al-Walid's death in 715 and appointed Yazid governor of Iraq, in place of the interim governor, the al-Hajjaj loyalist Yazid ibn Abi Muslim. He initially took up office in Wasit, and "speedily aroused opposition ... because of his exactions and arbitrary rule", according to the historian C. E. Bosworth. Yazid was wary of inviting the Iraqis' ire by emulating the stringent taxation policy of al-Hajjaj but also of falling short in revenue if he relaxed collections. Upon his request, the caliph divested him of fiscal authority and appointed Salih ibn Abd al-Rahman, a career tax official, to head the provincial treasury, leaving Yazid to head military and religious affairs. Salih answered directly to Sulayman and had his own Syrian guard. He consistently declined Yazid's exorbitant requests of the treasury.

Seeking to avoid Salih's financial constraints, Yazid persuaded the caliph to relocate to Khurasan in mid-716. While freeing himself of Salih's oversight was the motive ascribed to Yazid by the traditional sources, modern scholars consider the potential for greater profits in Khurasan and stronger tribal support there as additional motives. At the time, Khurasan had effectively been governed by the Tamim tribal chief Waki ibn Abi Sud for nine months. He had been chosen by the troops of Khurasan to lead them after their mutiny against Qutayba, who was killed attempting to revolt against Sulayman shortly after his accession. To justify replacing him, Yazid persuaded Sulayman that Waki was a rough Bedouin lacking in administrative ability. In addition to Khurasan, Yazid retained the governorship of Iraq and thus became the practical viceroy of the East. In the words of the historian Muhammad Abdulhayy Shaban, he became "Sulayman's own al-Hajjaj".

Bosworth comments that in Khurasan, distant from the caliphal center of power and with the solid backing of the Azdi soldiers, Yazid "could discriminate against the Tamim and other North Arab tribes and could engage in financial malpractices". The troops of Khurasan were largely drawn from the Basra garrison and were made up mainly of five tribal groups increasingly split into two factions: the Tamim and Qays of the 'northern' Mudar faction and the rival Bakr and Abd al-Qays, both grouped under the Rabi'a, and the 'southern' (Yamani) Azd. According to the historian Gerald Hawting, Yazid's period in office is associated with "the emergence of Mudari and Yemeni factionalism in the east", i.e. in Iraq and Khurasan. Yazid dismissed all of al-Hajjaj's appointees.

Yazid persecuted the relatives and subordinates of Qutayba in Khurasan. In Iraq, he had directed Salih to oversee the arrest and torture of al-Hajjaj's relatives, including the conqueror of Sind, Muhammad ibn al-Qasim, who was killed; the torture was administered by Yazid's brother Abd al-Malik. He installed his loyalists throughout the East: out of the seventeen appointments made by him, fourteen were to Yamanis and one to the Yamani-allied Rabi'a. His deference to and promotion of the Azd may have stemmed from his and the Muhallabids' desire to secure themselves as leaders of the tribe in spite of their "fairly obscure origin", according to Hawting. Yazid's time in office represented the peak of Muhallabid power. He appointed his brothers Habib, Marwan, Mudrik and Ziyad as the respective subgovernors of Sind, Basra, Sijistan, and Oman, while his son Mukhallad governed Khurasan in Yazid's absence.

=== Campaigns in Jurjan and Tabaristan ===
Watershed map of the Iranian regions along the southern Caspian coast in the 8th century, including Tabaristan, Jurjan, Gilan and Daylam

Qutayba had won renown for leading the troops of Khurasan to great conquests in Transoxiana, the massive region beyond the Oxus River. According to the historian Hugh N. Kennedy, "there is no doubt that Yazīd wanted to emulate him and show that he could lead armies against the unbelievers and reward them with abundant booty". In early 716, Yazid attempted to conquer the principalities of Jurjan and Tabaristan, located along the southern coast of the Caspian Sea. Ruled by local Iranian dynasties and shielded by the Alborz Mountains, these regions had remained largely independent of Muslim rule, despite repeated attempts to subdue them. The campaign lasted for four months and involved a 100,000-strong army assembled from the garrisons of Kufa, Basra, Rayy, Merv and Syria. It marked the first deployment of Syrian troops, the elite military faction of the Caliphate, to Khurasan.

The first target of the campaign were the isolated settlements of Dihistan, north of the river Atrek. There, Yazid blockaded the region's defenders, consisting mainly of Chöl Turks. According to one version of events, the dihqan sued for peace, obtaining amnesty from Yazid for him, his family and livestock. Yazid entered his territory, taking thousands of captives, including some 14,000 Turks whom he executed. In another version, the leader of Dihistan had retired to a small fortified island in the Caspian and made terms with Yazid, involving significant tribute, after a six-month siege. Once the Turks were defeated, Yazid proceeded to subdue Jurjan, which fell with little resistance, partly because some of the Iranian population were receptive to Arab protection from the Turks. He secured control of Jurjan by founding a city there (modern Gonbad-e Kavus).

Next, Yazid moved on Tabaristan, whose defenders had historically driven back attempts by Arab Muslim armies to enter the narrow passes of the mountains protecting their homeland. There, Yazid's initial success was reversed by Tabaristan's ruler, Farrukhan the Great, and his coalition from neighboring Daylam and Gilan, both Caspian-adjacent regions northwest of Tabaristan, in later confrontations that year. After having beaten the defenders in the plains, Yazid's troops came under assault by the defenders as they ascended the mountains. While they did not inflict heavy casualties on the Arabs, many of the latter died falling into ravines during the chaotic retreat. Spurred on by Farrukhan's victory, the people of Jurjan revolted against the small Arab garrison left there and Yazid's army came close to becoming surrounded and annihilated. In Kennedy's words, "Only some clever diplomacy allowed him [Yazid] to make a peace deal, which could be portrayed as a success". In return for a tributary arrangement with Farrukhan, Yazid withdrew Muslim troops from the region. Tabaristan remained independent of Arab rule until 760, when it was conquered by the Abbasids, the successors of the Umayyads, but remained a restive province dominated by local dynasts.

=== Second dismissal and imprisonment ===
In a letter, Yazid congratulated Sulayman on the conquests of Tabaristan and Jurjan, which had eluded previous caliphs until "God made this conquest on behalf" of Sulayman. He reported substantial spoils from the campaigns, declaring the customary fifth of the booty owed to the caliph to be six million dirhams. This huge sum was a boastful exaggeration. Since Yazid's campaign in Tabaristan was abortive, most of the booty must have come from Jurjan, according to the historian Khalid Yahya Blankinship. The letter did not reach the caliph, who died in September 717, and was instead received by Sulayman's successor, Umar II (r. 717–720). When Yazid did not forward to the caliph his fifth of the spoils from the Caspian campaigns, Umar recalled him from Khurasan and imprisoned him in Aleppo for allegedly pilfering these spoils. The viceroyalty of the East was broken up, with al-Jarrah ibn Abdallah al-Hakami appointed over Khurasan, Adi ibn Artat al-Fazari over Basra and a member of Caliph Umar's family over Kufa named Abd al-Hamid ibn Abd al-Rahman ibn Zayd ibn al-Khattab.

== Rebellion against the Umayyads ==
Map of medieval Basra, showing the division of the city into fifths along Arab tribal factional lines: Abd al-Qays, Tamim, Ahl al-Aliya (Qays), Bakr and Azd

Upon hearing that Umar was severely ill or that his designated successor, Yazid II (r. 720–724), had acceded, Yazid escaped from prison. He feared punishment by the new caliph for his role in the torture and deaths of members of al-Hajjaj's family, the caliph's in-laws. The caliph had long held suspicions, nurtured by al-Hajjaj, of Yazid's and the Muhallabid family's influence and ambitions in Iraq and the eastern Caliphate.

Yazid made for his family and tribal stronghold of Basra, evading pursuers from the Qays in the Jazira (Upper Mesopotamia) and the Kufan garrison along the way. Basra's governor, Ibn Artat, arrested many of Ibn al-Muhallab's brothers and cousins before his arrival to the city. He advanced against Yazid when the latter approached the city, but was unable to stop Yazid's entry. With support from his Yamani tribal allies in the Basra, Yazid besieged Ibn Artat in the city's citadel. Yazid then seized the citadel, captured the governor, and established control over Basra. The Mudari soldiers, despite their rivalry with the Yaman and ill disposition toward Yazid, did not actively or effectively oppose him. Tribal factionalism was not a decisive factor in Yazid's recruitment: though many of the Azd backed him, several opposed his bid and he gained no support from the Yaman in Syria, while many Mudari soldiers in Basra and elsewhere in Iraq joined him.

The caliph pardoned Yazid, but he maintained his opposition, declaring holy war (jihad) against the caliph and the Syrian troops who historically enforced Umayyad rule in Iraq. Through this appeal, he gained support among the religious opponents of Umayyad rule, including from some Kharijites. Among the latter was al-Sumayda al-Kindi. Most of the pious Qur'an readers and the mawālī (non-Arab Muslim converts) of Basra supported Yazid's cause, with the exception of the prominent scholar al-Hasan al-Basri.

Umar II had likely withdrawn most of the Syrians from Wasit, their main Iraqi garrison, and Yazid captured the city with relative ease. In the summer, he gained the support of Basra's dependencies, namely Ahwaz, Fars and Kerman, though not Khurasan, where Mudari troops counterbalanced the pro-Muhallabid Yamani faction in the province's garrisons. Yazid then advanced toward Kufa, where he attracted support across the tribal spectrum and among many of its noble Arab households, including from the families of al-Ash'ath and Malik al-Ashtar. Nonetheless, Kufan support was not unanimous, and the governor of the city took up position at Nukhayla, on Kufa's southern outskirts, to block Yazid's advance.

In the meantime, Yazid II dispatched his brother and nephew, the veteran commanders Maslama ibn Abd al-Malik and al-Abbas ibn al-Walid, to suppress the revolt with the Syrian army. They crossed the Euphrates River and encamped near Yazid's position, which was situated at a place called al-Aqr lit. 'the Castle'), close to the site of Babylon. According to Hawting, at this point, the pious supporters of Yazid, led by al-Sumayda and the Murji'ite Abu Rabu, became a liability as they insisted Yazid first allow the Syrians to repent on the basis of the Quran and the Sunna, instead of mounting an assault against them. Their actions was reminiscent of Caliph Ali's pious supporters' demand of him at the Battle of Siffin against the Syrians in 657. Having lost confidence in his troops as a result of this, Yazid supposedly despaired of his dependence on the numerous Iraqis rather than the Azd of Khurasan.

Hostilities commenced on 24 August when Maslama crossed the bridge over the Euphrates towards Yazid's camp and burned the bridge behind him. Beginning with the Tamim of Kufa, the Iraqis abandoned the field. Dismissing advice from his counsel to withdraw to Wasit and regroup, Yazid and some of his supporters confronted the Syrians and was slain, along with two of his brothers and al-Sumayda. Roughly two hundred prisoners-of-war were captured from Yazid's camp and were executed on the caliph's orders. Yazid's son Mu'awiya retaliated with the execution of Ibn Artat and his thirty supporters incarcerated in Wasit. Numerous fugitives from Yazid's army fled in different directions, with the Muhallabids and some of the Kufan noblemen escaping first to Basra and from there taking boats to Kerman and ultimately to Qandabil in Sind. The Umayyad authorities pursued and killed many of the Muhallabids, including nine to fourteen boys who were sent to Yazid II and executed by his order.

=== Aftermath ===
In the words of Kennedy, Yazid "was perhaps the only indigenous Iraqi leader to have survived al-Hajjaj's rule" and was "the last of the old-style Iraqi champions". As before under Caliph Ali (r. 656–661), the Zubayrid ruler Mus'ab ibn al-Zubayr (r. 685–691), and Ibn al-Ash'ath, divisions among the Iraqis under Yazid had enabled the Umayyads and their elite Syrian troops to defeat them and impose their rule in Iraq. The suppression of his revolt marked the last of the great anti-Umayyad uprisings in Iraq. The defeat of the Muhallabids and the successive appointments to the governorship of Iraq of the pro-Qaysi Maslama and shortly after Maslama's lieutenant, the Qaysi stalwart Umar ibn Hubayra al-Fazari, by the caliph signaled a triumph for the Mudar faction in the province and its eastern dependencies. According to Wellhausen, "the proscription of the whole of the prominent and powerful [Muhallabid] family, a measure hitherto unheard of in the history of the Umaiyids [sic], came like a declaration of war against the Yemen [faction] in general, and the corollary was that the government was degenerating into a Qaisite party-rule". The Yamani tribes of Khurasan viewed the events as a humiliation and during the Abbasid Revolution which toppled the Umayyads in 750 they adopted as one of their slogans "revenge for the Banu Muhallab [Muhallabids]".

== Bibliography ==
- Blankinship, Khalid Yahya (1994). The End of the Jihâd State: The Reign of Hishām ibn ʻAbd al-Malik and the Collapse of the Umayyads. Albany, New York: State University of New York Press. ISBN 978-0-7914-1827-7.
- Bosworth, C. E. (1968). Sīstān under the Arabs: From the Islamic Conquest to the Rise of the Ṣaffārids (30–250, 651–864). Rome: Istituto italiano per il Medio ed Estremo Oriente. ISBN 9788863231243. OCLC 956878036.
- Crone, Patricia (1980). Slaves on Horses: The Evolution of the Islamic Polity. Cambridge: Cambridge University Press. ISBN 0-521-52940-9.
- Crone, P. (1993). "Al-Muhallab b. Abī Ṣufra". In Bosworth, C. E.; van Donzel, E.; Heinrichs, W. P. & Pellat, Ch. (eds.). The Encyclopaedia of Islam, Second Edition. Volume VII: Mif–Naz. Leiden: E. J. Brill. p. 357. ISBN 978-90-04-09419-2.
- Crone, P. (1993b). "Muhallabids". In Bosworth, C. E.; van Donzel, E.; Heinrichs, W. P. & Pellat, Ch. (eds.). The Encyclopaedia of Islam, Second Edition. Volume VII: Mif–Naz. Leiden: E. J. Brill. pp. 358–360. ISBN 978-90-04-09419-2.
- Crone, Patricia (1994). "Were the Qays and Yemen of the Umayyad Period Political Parties?". Der Islam. 71: 1–57. doi:10.1515/islm.1994.71.1.1. S2CID 154370527.
- Dixon, 'Abd al-Ameer (1971). The Umayyad Caliphate, 65–86/684–705: (A Political Study). London: Luzac. ISBN 978-0718901493.
- Eisener, R. (1997). "Sulaymān b. ʿAbd al-Malik". In Bosworth, C. E.; van Donzel, E.; Heinrichs, W. P. & Lecomte, G. (eds.). The Encyclopaedia of Islam, Second Edition. Volume IX: San–Sze. Leiden: E. J. Brill. pp. 821–822. ISBN 978-90-04-10422-8.
- Gil, Moshe (1997) [1983]. A History of Palestine, 634–1099. Translated by Ethel Broido. Cambridge: Cambridge University Press. ISBN 0-521-59984-9.
- Hawting, Gerald R. (2000). The First Dynasty of Islam: The Umayyad Caliphate AD 661–750 (Second ed.). London and New York: Routledge. ISBN 0-415-24072-7.
- Hinds, Martin, ed. (1990). The History of al-Ṭabarī, Volume XXIII: The Zenith of the Marwānid House: The Last Years of ʿAbd al-Malik and the Caliphate of al-Walīd, A.D. 700–715/A.H. 81–95. SUNY Series in Near Eastern Studies. Albany, New York: State University of New York Press. ISBN 978-0-88706-721-1.
- Hodge, Malek (2017). "Tabaristan during the 'Abbasid Period: The Overlapping Coinage of the Governors and other Officials (144–178H)". In Faghfoury, Mostafa (ed.). Iranian Numismatic Studies: A Volume in Honor of Stephen Album. Lancaster and London: Classical Numismatic Group. pp. 71–78. ISBN 978-0-9837-6522-6.
- Kennedy, Hugh (2004). The Prophet and the Age of the Caliphates: The Islamic Near East from the 6th to the 11th Century (Second ed.). Harlow: Longman. ISBN 978-0-582-40525-7.
- Kennedy, Hugh (2007). The Great Arab Conquests: How the Spread of Islam Changed the World We Live In. Philadelphia: Da Capo Press. ISBN 978-0-306-81585-0.
- Madelung, W. (1975). "The Minor Dynasties of Northern Iran". In Frye, Richard N. (ed.). The Cambridge History of Iran. Vol. 4. Cambridge: Cambridge University Press. pp. 198–249. ISBN 0-521-20093-8.
- Madelung, Wilferd (2011) [1993]. "Dabuyids". Encyclopaedia Iranica (Online).
- Powers, David S., ed. (1989). The History of al-Ṭabarī, Volume XXIV: The Empire in Transition: The Caliphates of Sulaymān, ʿUmar, and Yazīd, A.D. 715–724/A.H. 96–105. SUNY Series in Near Eastern Studies. Albany, New York: State University of New York Press. ISBN 978-0-7914-0072-2.
- Rowson, Everett K., ed. (1989). The History of al-Ṭabarī, Volume XXII: The Marwānid Restoration: The Caliphate of ʿAbd al-Malik, A.D. 693–701/A.H. 74–81. SUNY Series in Near Eastern Studies. Albany, New York: State University of New York Press. ISBN 978-0-88706-975-8.
- Shaban, M. A. (1970). The Abbasid Revolution. Cambridge: Cambridge University Press. ISBN 0-521-29534-3.
- Sharon, Moshe (1983). Black Banners from the East: The Establishment of the ʿAbbāsid State: Incubation of a Revolt. The Max Schloessinger Memorial Series. Jerusalem and Leiden: The Magnes Press and Brill. ISBN 965-223-501-6.
- Sprengling, Martin (April 1939). "From Persian to Arabic". The American Journal of Semitic Languages and Literatures. 56 (2). The University of Chicago Press: 175–224. doi:10.1086/370538. JSTOR 528934. S2CID 170486943.
- Strenziok, Gert (1960). "Azd". In Gibb, H. A. R.; Kramers, J. H.; Lévi-Provençal, E.; Schacht, J.; Lewis, B. & Pellat, Ch. (eds.). The Encyclopaedia of Islam, Second Edition. Volume I: A–B. Leiden: E. J. Brill. pp. 811–813. OCLC 495469456.
- Ulrich, Brian (2019). Arabs in the Early Islamic Empire: Exploring al-Azd Tribal Identity. Edinburgh: Edinburgh University Press. ISBN 978-1-4744-3682-3.
- Wellhausen, Julius (1927). The Arab Kingdom and its Fall. Translated by Margaret Graham Weir. Calcutta: University of Calcutta. OCLC 752790641.
- Zetterstéen, K. V. (1993) [1913–1938]. "Yazīd b. al-Muhallab b. Abī Sufra al-Azdī". In Houtsma, M. Th.; A. J. Wensinck; Gibb, H. A. R.; Heffening, W.; Lévi-Provençal, E. (eds.). E. J. Brill's First Encyclopaedia of Islam 1913–1936, Volume VII Ṭāʾif – Zūrkhāna (Reprint ed.). Leiden, New York and Köln: Brill. p. 1163. ISBN 90-04-09794-5.

Preceded by al-Muhallab ibn Abi Sufra	Governor of Khurasan; 702–704	Succeeded by al-Mufaddal ibn al-Muhallab
Preceded by Yazid ibn Abi Kabsha	Governor of Iraq; 715–718	Vacant Governorship of Iraq abolished Title next held by Maslama ibn Abd al-Malik
