= Nawwar (concubine of Al-Walid II) =

Nawwar or Al-Nawar (floruit 744) was a slave concubine of the Umayyad Caliph Al-Walid II (r. 743–744).

Caliph al-Walid had many concubines, of whom many were also qiyan, and Al-Nawar and Shuhda were described as singers. Nawwar was described as a favorite concubine. She became infamous for an incident that was seen as deeply offensive and was later described as a scandal, which was seen as an example of the decadence of the Umayyad dynasty.

Caliph al-Walid was described as a decadent regent who indulged in drinking, singing and hunting. On one occasion, he was noted to be so intoxicated that he was not in a fit state to lead the morning prayer for the men of the Palace. He was called to lead the prayers after he had just finished having intercourse with Nawwar. He could not perform the prayers himself, but swore that no one but Nawwar would replace him in leading the Muslims in prayer as imam. His entourage was shocked, but no one could protest to his command.

Nawwar consequently performed the prayers as the leader of the male courtiers, dressed as a man and with her face covered, but with a perfectly obvious female voice, and according to al-Isfahani, she conducted the ritual correctly and as instructed; the chronicle states that "[the concubine was under the influence of drink, and was junub (unwashed) after having copulated, when she performed the prayer]".
