= Kushaniya =

Medieval town in Transoxiana

Map of Rabinjan in the tenth century

Kushaniya or al-Kushaniya was a medieval town in the region of Transoxiana, located close to Samarkand, on the northern road between the cities of Samarkand and Bukhara. It was located in the vicinity of the present-day Rabinjan. According to Al-Istakhri, it was two farsakhs (about 10 kilometers) from Rabinjan.

Chinese sources, such as the Book of the Later Han reported its name as "He, also called Kushuangnijia or Guishangni" (何，或曰屈霜你迦，曰贵霜匿).
