= Yazid ibn Abi Muslim =

Yazid ibn Abi Muslim يزيد بن أبي مسلم

Governor of Ifriqiya
- In office 720–721
- Monarch: Yazid II
- Preceded by: Ismail ibn Abdallah
- Succeeded by: Muhammad ibn Yazid

Personal details
- Died: 721 Kairouan

Military service
- Allegiance: Umayyad Caliphate

Yazid ibn Abi Muslim (Arabic: يزيد بن أبي مسلم) was the Umayyad governor of Ifriqiya from 720 until his assassination in 721.

Yazid ibn Abi Muslim was from the Arab tribe of Thaqif. He served in the administration of Al-Hajjaj ibn Yusuf, the Umayyad governor of Wasit (Iraq). He rose in the ranks to become al-Hajjaj's secretary. During the illnesses that plagued al-Hajjaj's health before his death in 714, Yazid ibn Abi Muslim frequently stood in as his deputy. After al-Hajjaj's death, he was confirmed in that post by Caliph al-Walid I.

When the Caliph Sulayman came to power in 715, Yazid ibn Abi Muslim was immediately dismissed (along with much of the rest of al-Hajjaj's appointees). It is said Yazid was imprisoned at that time, but subsequently released when no evidence of misconduct could be found to bring up charges. Another chronicle reports Yazid was only released c. 717 by the Caliph Omar II in an act of general clemency

In 720, in the course of a new administrative sweep, Caliph Yazid II appointed Yazid ibn Abi Muslim as governor of Ifriqiya (North Africa), with supervisory authority over al-Andalus (Iberian Peninsula).

Yazid ibn Abi Muslim's tenure in Ifriqiya was not a happy one. Perhaps recalling the brutish administration of his mentor al-Hajjaj in Wasit (Iraq), Yazid ibn Abi Muslim showed little respect for non-Arab Muslims under his jurisdiction. His predecessor in Kairouan, Ismail ibn Abd Allah ibn Abu al-Muhajjar had put much effort into integrating Muslim Berbers into the Caliphal mainstream. Yazid immediately went about undoing all that, relegating Berber officers and increasing fiscal exactions upon the Berber populace. Side-stepping the legal prohibitions, Yazid re-imposed the jizyah (non-Muslim poll taxes) on Muslim Berbers and expanded other extraordinary taxes and tributes.

According to the chronicler Ibn Abd-el-Hakem, in 721, Yazid ibn Abi Muslim decided to humiliate the Berber guard of Kairouan by having their hands tattooed - - their personal names on their right hand, and the phrase "Guard of Yazid" on their left. The Berber guard decided that enough was enough, and killed Yazid ibn Abi Muslim. A previous governor, Muhammad ibn Yazid, was installed as temporary replacement, until a new governor was dispatched by Damascus.

Ibn Khallikan (p. 202) asserts that the Berber guard was pardoned by Caliph Yazid II, upon receipt of the report of Yazid's abusive administration in Ifriqiya. Yazid II appointed Bishr ibn Safwan al-Kalbi as the new governor in late 721.

However, Ibn Khaldun (p. 354), suggests that Abd-Allah ibn Musa, a son of former governor Musa ibn Nusayr, might have been behind the plot of the Berber guard, and that the Caliph ordered Abd-Allah arrested and executed, which Bishr ibn Safwan reluctantly obeyed.

== See also ==
- History of early Islamic Tunisia
- History of medieval Tunisia

== Sources ==
- Ibn Khaldun, Histoire des Berbères et des dynasties musulmanes de l'Afrique, 1852 trans., Algiers, Vol. 1
- Ibn Khallikan Ibn Khallikan's Biographical Dictionary, Vol. 4, trans. 1872, Paris
- Taha, Abd al-Wahid Dhannun (1989) The Muslim conquest and settlement of North Africa and Spain, London, Routledge.

Preceded by Ismail ibn Abdallah ibn Abu al-Muhajjar	Governor of Ifriqiya; 720–721	Succeeded by Muhammad ibn Yazid
