= Adi ibn Artah al-Fazari =

Umayyad governor of Basra
- In office 717–720
- Monarch: Umar II (r. 717–720)
- Preceded by: Yazid ibn al-Muhallab
- Succeeded by: Maslama ibn Abd al-Malik

Personal details
- Died: 720 Wasit
- Relations: Fazara (paternal tribe)
- Children: Muhammad
- Parent: Artah ibn Kaab al-Fazari (father)

Adi ibn Artah al-Fazari (Arabic: عدي بن أرطاة الفزاري) (died 720) was an official in the service of the Umayyad dynasty, serving as governor of Basra during the caliphate of 'Umar ibn 'Abd al-'Aziz from 717 to 720. He was killed shortly after during the revolt of Yazid ibn al-Muhallab.

== Career under Umar II ==
Adi was appointed to the governorship of Basra by the caliph Umar II shortly after the latter's ascension in 717. After receiving his appointment, he established himself in Basra; he also ordered the arrest of his predecessor Yazid ibn al-Muhallab, whom Umar had dismissed from the governorship of Iraq. Once Yazid was captured, Adi shipped him to the caliph's residence in Syria, where he was cast into prison.

Adi served as governor of Basra for the duration of Umar's caliphate. Unlike Yazid, who had been governor of all of Iraq and the eastern provinces, Adi did not have authority over Kufa and Khurasan, which were placed under separate governors. His area of responsibility, however, was still considerable, and extended from Basra and Bahrayn in the west to Sind in the east. Oman was also initially under Adi's authority, but Umar revoked his jurisdiction over it after receiving complaints about his lieutenant's administration there.

During Adi's governorship, he authorized public works projects in Basra; a canal was dug to provide water to the city's residents and was named after him. A second canal which was completed was named after Adi's chief of police. He also wanted to enlarge the governor's residence in the city but was reportedly dissuaded from doing so by Umar. During his administration, a plague struck in 718-719 and was named the "plague of Adi ibn Artah."

== The Muhallabid revolt ==
Shortly after the death of Umar in February 720, Adi received a message from the new caliph Yazid II informing him that Yazid ibn al-Muhallab had escaped from prison and that he was likely heading toward Iraq. On the caliph's orders, Adi arrested and imprisoned the Muhallabids who were in Basra and prepared for a confrontation with Yazid; the local army was organized and a trench was dug around the city.

As Yazid advanced toward Basra, however, Adi's defense began to fall apart. Many of his men refused to fight against Yazid, and contingents that were sent out to stop his march instead allowed him to pass by unmolested. Yazid also began offering higher stipends to the Basrans, which increased his popularity among them. Consequently, when he arrived at Basra he was able to enter the city without much difficulty. The Syrians and Basrans who remained loyal to Adi attempted to mount a defense outside the fortress of Basra, but they were defeated and the fortress was stormed by Yazid's men. The remainder of Adi's forces fled to Kufa; Adi himself was captured and brought before Yazid, who ordered his confinement.

Following Yazid's conquest of Basra, Adi was transferred to Wasit, which was put under the command of Yazid's son Mu'awiya. He remained incarcerated there until Yazid was killed in battle against Maslama ibn Abd al-Malik in August 720. When news of Yazid's fate reached Wasit, Mu'awiya took out a number of prisoners under his charge, including Adi and his son Muhammad, and executed them in retaliation for his father's death.

== Notes ==
Preceded by Marwan ibn al-Muhallab	Governor of al-Basrah; 717–720	Succeeded by Marwan ibn al-Muhallab
