= Muhammad ibn Yusuf al-Thaqafi =

8th-century Umayyad provincial governor

Deputy governor of Fars
- Deputy: to Al-Hajjaj ibn Yusuf
- Succeeded by: Muhammad ibn al-Qasim

Governor of Yemen
- In office 713/714–715
- Monarch: Al-Walid I

Personal details
- Born: Ta'if
- Died: c. 714/5
- Children: Umm al-Hajjaj bint Muhammad; Yusuf ibn Muhammad ibn Yusuf al-Thaqafi (Governor of Medina)
- Parent(s): Yusuf ibn Hakam al-Thaqafi (father) al-Fari'a bint Hammam ibn Urwa al-Thaqafi (mother)
- Relatives: Al-Walid II (grandson); Al-Hajjaj ibn Yusuf (brother)

Muḥammad ibn Yūsuf ibn al-Ḥakam ibn Abī ʿAqīl al-Thaqafī (Arabic: محمد بن يوسف بن الحكم بن أبي عقيل الثقفي) was a governor of the Umayyad Caliphate in the early 8th century.

The brother of the powerful governor of Iraq, al-Hajjaj ibn Yusuf, Muhammad served under his brother as deputy governor for Fars. He is credited as the founder of the city of Shiraz, which became the capital of Fars, in 693. He later served as governor for the Yemen. He died in the latter office in 714/5. His daughter Umm al-Hajjaj married caliph Yazid II (r. 620–624), and their son, al-Walid II (r. 743–744), ruled as the eleventh Umayyad caliph.

== Sources ==
- Crone, Patricia (1980). Slaves on Horses: The Evolution of the Islamic Polity (1980 ed.). Cambridge: Cambridge University Press. ISBN 978-0521229616.
- Hinds, Martin, ed. (1990). The History of al-Ṭabarī, Volume XXIII: The Zenith of the Marwānid House: The Last Years of ʿAbd al-Malik and the Caliphate of al-Walīd, A.D. 700–715/A.H. 81–95. SUNY Series in Near Eastern Studies. Albany, New York: State University of New York Press. ISBN 978-0-88706-721-1.
- Lambton, Ann K. S. (1997). "Shīrāz". In Bosworth, C. E.; van Donzel, E.; Heinrichs, W. P. & Lecomte, G. (eds.). The Encyclopaedia of Islam, Second Edition. Volume IX: San–Sze. Leiden: E. J. Brill. pp. 772–479. ISBN 978-90-04-10422-8.
- Limbert, John (2004). Shiraz in the Age of Hafez: The Glory of a Medieval Persian City. Seattle and London: University of Washington Press. ISBN 0-295-98391-4.
- Powers, David S., ed. (1989). The History of al-Ṭabarī, Volume XXIV: The Empire in Transition: The Caliphates of Sulaymān, ʿUmar, and Yazīd, A.D. 715–724/A.H. 96–105. SUNY Series in Near Eastern Studies. Albany, New York: State University of New York Press. ISBN 978-0-7914-0072-2.
