= Muhallabids =

Arab family

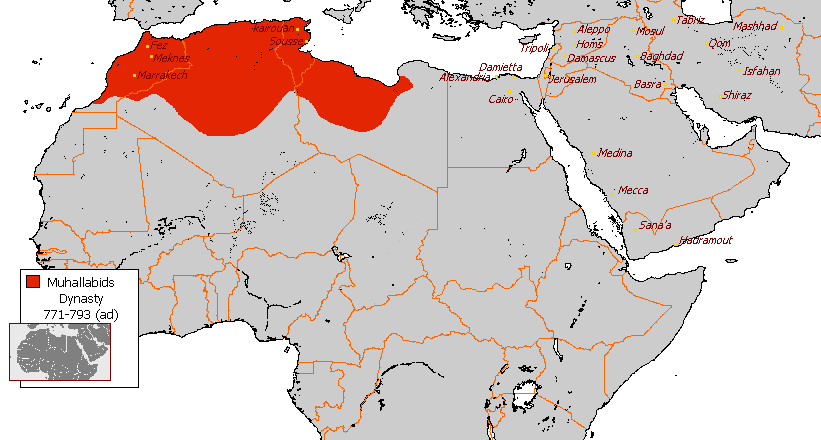
Muhallabids dynasty المهلبيون
- Parent family: Azd
- Country: Umayyad Caliphate and Abbasid Caliphate: Ifriqiya; Basra; Ahwaz; Khurasan
- Place of origin: Dibba, Arabia
- Founded: 698
- Founder: Al-Muhallab ibn Abi Sufra
- Deposition: 812

The Muhallabids (Arabic: المهلبيون) or the Muhallabid dynasty were an Arab family and state who became prominent in the middle Umayyad Caliphate, and reached its greatest eminence under the early Abbasids, when members of the family ruled Basra and Ifriqiya.

The founders of the family's fortunes were al-Muhallab ibn Abi Sufra (c. 632 – 702) and his son Yazid ibn al-Muhallab (672–720), governor of Khurasan and Iraq, who led an unsuccessful anti-Umayyad rebellion in Basra in 720. Despite his defeat and death, the family remained influential in their power base of Basra, and at the time of the Abbasid Revolution they rose up in their support. Despite the support of some Muhallabids to the abortive Alid revolt of Muhammad al-Nafs al-Zakiyya, the new Abbasid regime rewarded their support with governorships at Basra and the Ahwaz, but most prominently in Ifriqiya, where the family ruled in uninterrupted succession from 768 to 795. Ifriqiya under their rule enjoyed a period of prosperity, above all agriculture was reinvigorated by the expansion of irrigation systems. The Muhallabids of Ifriqiya enjoyed a great deal of autonomy and were able to maintain Arab rule in the face of revolts by the Berbers. They were unable however to prevent the formation of the kingdoms of the Arab Idrisids in Morocco and the Persian Rustamids in central Algeria.

The family fell from power during and after the Fourth Fitna (fourth civil war), when the traditional Arab families began to be increasingly sidelined by Caliph al-Ma'mun's Turkic and Iranian generals. One of the few members of the family who rose to prominence after that was Abu Muhammad al-Hasan al-Muhallabi, the capable vizier of the 10th-century Buyid emir Mu'izz al-Dawla.

== Sources ==
- Crone, P. (1993). "Muhallabids". In Bosworth, C. E.; van Donzel, E.; Heinrichs, W. P. & Pellat, Ch. (eds.). The Encyclopaedia of Islam, Second Edition. Volume VII: Mif–Naz. Leiden: E. J. Brill. pp. 358–360. ISBN 978-90-04-09419-2.
- Wellhausen, Julius (1927). The Arab Kingdom and Its Fall. Translated by Margaret Graham Weir. Calcutta: University of Calcutta.
