= Batriyya =

Branch of Zaydī Islam

Batriyya or Butriyya (Arabic: بترية, romanized: Batrīyyah, adjective form Batrī) or Batrism is an early branch of Zaydī Islam.

The Batriyya were a group of moderates who emerged in Kūfa and played a significant role in the formation of early Zaydism in the 8th century. They held positions similar to those of Zayd ibn ʿAlī, and their theological positions and practices represented a middle ground between Shīʿa factions and proto-Sunnism. The Batriyya were instrumental in shaping the early Zaydī movement alongside Jārūdiyya, which embraced the activist agenda of other Shīʿī groups.

== Historical Context ==
The Batriyya emerged in the milieu of early Islamic sectarian development. They were contemporaries of the Jārūdiyya, with both groups contributing to the establishment of Zaydism.

According to Madelung, the name Batriyya is commonly traced to the nickname al-Abtar, which was associated with Kathīr al-Nawwāʾ. The term is related to the concept of “mutilating” (batr). Some sources suggest it refers to the group's alleged curtailment of the legitimate rights of the Prophet’s family. Others interpret it as a reference to their practice of reciting the basmala in prayer only in a subdued voice. A third explanation connects it to their rejection of Caliph ʿUthmān’s rule during the last six years of his reign. Among these interpretations, Madelung considers the first—relating to internal Shīʿī disputes over the rightful status of the Prophet’s family— the most plausible for the origin of the name.

The Zaydiyya ultimately became a major branch of Shīʿa Islam, known for their unique blend of theological and political doctrines.

== Political views ==
The Batriyya held distinct views on several key political issues:

=== Succession and the Imamate ===
The Batriyya recognized ʿAlī ibn Abī Ṭālib as the "most excellent of Muslims" following Prophet Muḥammad. They believed that ʿAlī designated al-Ḥasan as the imām after his death, and that al-Ḥasan subsequently designated al-Ḥusayn. After that, the imām was not chosen by designation but by merit among their descendants. Any descendant of al-Ḥasan or al-Ḥusayn who took up arms and called people to the path of God, demonstrating knowledge, justice and virtue, was recognized as the imām. The Batrīyya also allowed for the possibility that the world may be without an imām, or that there may be multiple imāms at the same time. They argued that since it was possible for the world to be without a prophet, it was thus possible for it to be without an imām. Additionally, as there could be multiple prophets at one time, there could also be multiple imāms. They also supported the imāmate of a "person of lesser excellence" if necessary.

Zayd ibn ʿAlī explained the concept of a man of lesser excellence, or al-mafḍūl, serving as imām by noting that, although ʿAlī ibn Abī Ṭālib was the most distinguished of the Companions, the caliphate was entrusted to Abū Bakr. This decision was based on considerations of expediency, religious factors, and the fact that the people’s hearts were not yet ready to fully accept ʿAlī’s leadership at that time.

=== Legitimacy of the First Two Caliphs ===
The Batriyya accepted the legitimacy of the first two caliphs, Abū Bakr and ʿUmar ibn al-Khaṭṭāb, arguing that ʿAlī ibn Abī Ṭālib's lack of objection constituted tacit approval of their rule:

"We consent to whom he consented to, for it is unlawful for us to do otherwise." This was in stark contrast to the Jārūdiyya who claimed that "anyone, who pushed ʿAlī away from that position, was blasphemous; and that the community was blasphemous and misguided when it abstained from giving the allegiance to him".

=== Legitimacy of the Third Caliph ===
The Batrīs refrained from passing judgment on ʿUthmān ibn ʿAffān:

"When we hear traditions in ʿUthmān's favour and hear that he is one of the ten to whom Paradise is promised, we admit that we must acknowledge the soundness of his islām and his faith, and that he is one of those who will go to Paradise; but when we look at his deeds, such as his negligence in failing to discipline the Umayyads and the Banū Marwān, or his autocratic behaviour contrary to the ways of the Companions, we feel obliged to say, we must declare him an unbeliever. We are, therefore, uncertain about him; so we suspend judgment, and refer the matter to the best of Judges."

== Legal Views ==
=== Knowledge and Legal Authority ===
The Batriyya did not attribute exclusive religious knowledge to the Prophet’s family but recognized the validity of knowledge transmitted within the broader Muslim community. They permitted the use of individual reasoning (ijtihād) and analogy (qiyās) in establishing the law. This aligned them with early proto-Sunnī traditions.

The Batriyya permitted ʿAlids to study under various non-ʿAlid scholars, including those who emphasized the exclusive legal authority of teachings from the Prophet’s Companions. Their acknowledgment of the moral integrity of all the Companions reinforced their commitment to these traditions as legitimate sources of religious knowledge. Since this knowledge was considered learned rather than divinely inspired, candidates for the Imāmate were required to demonstrate a thorough understanding of the law and its foundational texts. This approach to knowledge was also consistent with the proto-Sunnī perspectives of the early eighth century.

=== Ritual Practices ===
The Batrīs maintained ritual practices in line with Kūfan traditionalism, such as "substitute shoe-rubbing" (masḥ ʿalā’l-khuffayn) and the consumption of eel and date wine.

== Theological Beliefs ==
The Batrīyya were critical of several beliefs held by the majority of the Kufan Shīʿis:

- Rajʿa (Return): They rejected the doctrine that certain figures would return from the dead before the Resurrection.
- Taqiyya (Dissimulation): They opposed the practice of hiding one’s true beliefs in the face of persecution. Application of taqiyya differed greatly: A Kūfan named ʿUmar b. Riyāḥ visited al-Bāqir; in Medina and asked a question about ritual law that he had previously asked a year earlier. This time, however, al-Baqir gave a ruling that contradicted his earlier decision. When ʿUmar challenged him to explain the inconsistency, the imām referred to taqiyya. ʿUmar was not convinced and pointed out the absence of any external threat that would justify dissimulation. He then reported the incident to some of his colleagues in Kūfah, who subsequently converted to Batrī Zaydism.
- Badāʾ (Change in Divine Will): Batrīs were critical of the concept of badāʾ, which refers to a change in divine will due to historical circumstances. For instance, during the disputed succession following Jaʿfar al-Ṣādiq’s death, some Shīʿis used this idea when his expected successor, his eldest son Ismāʿīl, predeceased him. Heresiographers underline that many of al-Ṣādiq’s followers who rejected this explanation became Batrīs.

== Batrī vs. Jārūdī Zaydism ==
The terms "Batrī" or "Jārūdī" refer to theological orientations rather than distinct, identifiable groups.

Batrī and Jārūdī Zaydism
| Batrī Zaydism: | Jārūdī Zaydism: |
| ʿAlī’s designation was implicit. | ʿAlī’s designation was explicit. |
| Opponents of ʿAlī made a mistake in reasoning. Those who took up arms repented. | Opponents of ʿAlī are apostates. Those who took up arms are also apostates. |
| Judgment: No cursing them or declaring them apostates. | Judgment: Cursing them and declaring them apostates is allowed. |
| Allows for the Imāmate of the less worthy candidate. | Restricts the Imāmate to the most worthy candidate. |
| Legal authority diffused in the larger Muslim community. | Legal authority restricted to the descendants of ʿAlī and Fāṭima. |
| Rejects the theological doctrines of rajʿa, taqiyya, and badāʾ. | Accepts the theological doctrines of rajʿa, taqiyya, and badāʾ. |

These are the main traits linked to Batrī and Jārūdī Zaydis.

== Prominent Figures ==
=== Zayd ibn ʿAlī ===
Zayd ibn ʿAlī (d. 120-1/740) was a descendant of al-Ḥusayn ibn ʿAlī. Zaydiyya emerged from his rebellion in Kūfa in 740. At this time Zaydiyya did not designate a religious group, but rather a socio-political group. This can also be seen from the backing Zayd ibn ʿAlī received. Many leading scholars including Abū Ḥanīfa (d. 767), eponym of Sunnī Ḥanafī school of law, supported Zayd ibn ʿAlī in 740.

Zayd ibn ʿAlī was moderate in his views on the succession of the Prophet, he refused to condemn the first two caliphs, ʾAbū Bakr and ʿUmar ibn al-Khaṭṭāb and, contrary to many Shīʿī groups, accepted the religious authority of non-ʿAlid scholars, such as his teacher Wāṣil b. ʿAṭā.

Najam Haider considers the supporters of Zayd and his son Yaḥyā to be Batrī as they were Kūfan traditionists (proto-Sunnī) and supported ʿAlid military uprisings and political claims.

=== Yaḥyā ibn Zayd ===
Yaḥyā was the eldest son of Zayd ibn ʿAlī. He was the only one who joined Zayd's rebellion.

Following the failed rebellion in Kūfa, Yaḥyā fled to Khorāsān with a few of his father's remaining supporters. He stayed in hiding, moving between different locations, until he was eventually captured by the Umayyads in Balkh and imprisoned in Marw, the provincial capital. After his release from prison, Yaḥyā eventually made his way back to Nīshāpūr and fought his first battle against Umayyads. Later, he moved on to Jūzjān and was ultimately killed in another battle.

=== Abū Ismāʿīl Kathīr b. Ismāʿīl al-Taymī, known as Kathīr al-Nawwāʾ ===
Kathīr al-Nawwāʾ is closely linked to the origins of the Batriyya sect, as the name is commonly traced to his nickname al-Abtar, making him the eponym of the group. He was likely born before the turn of the Islamic century (100 AH/718-719 CE) and, as an adult, may have witnessed the revolt of the gnostic Al-Mughīra ibn Saʿīd. He was a freed slave (mawlā), but the exact reasons for his notable reputation remain unclear.

Kathīr al-Nawwāʾ may be the same person as Kathīr al-Khidrī, who pledged allegiance to Zayd b. ʿAlī. Al-Khidrī was part of the Khidra, a subgroup within the Taym Allāh tribe, and Kathīr al-Nawwāʾ’s nisba (al-Taymī) also ties him to the same tribal network.

=== Hārūn b. Saʿd al-ʿIjlī ===
Hārūn b. Saʿd al-ʿIjlī was a traditionist and Islamic jurist who played a leading role in the Batriyya movement, supporting both Zayd b. ʿAlī and later Ibrāhīm b. ʿAbdallāh in their revolts. His followers are known as the ʿIjlīyya.

According to van Ess, despite Ibrāhīm b. ʿAbdallāh’s general dislike for him, he was appointed governor of Wāsiṭ, where he delivered a khuṭbah criticizing al-Manṣūr’s rule and social injustices, earning the favor of local religious scholars. When al-Manṣūr’s forces besieged Wāsiṭ, he refrained from launching an attack, likely due to his old age, cautious nature, and potentially as a political strategy, waiting for the outcome at Bākhamrā. After the battle, he fled to Baṣra.

=== Chiefs of Batriyya in the Time of Muḥammad al-Bāqir ===
Besides Kathīr al-Nawwāʾ, Imāmī sources identify several Kūfan figures —Sālim b. Abī Ḥafṣa, al-Ḥakam b. ʿUtayba, Salama b. Kuhayl, and Abu ’l-Miḳdād Thābit al-Ḥaddād—as the chiefs of the Batriyya during the time of Muḥammad al-Bāqir, the fifth of the twelve Shia imams. They are described as rejecting his authority as imām and sole religious authority, criticizing him for ambiguities in his teachings.

Al-Ḥakam b. ʿUtayba was a Kūfan (d. 115 AH/733 CE) jurist and a mawlā (a freed slave) from the Kinda tribe. He was regarded as a leading legal scholar, particularly in Qurʾānic exegesis and the biography of the Prophet. Later in his life, according to some sources, he was appointed as a judge (qāḍī).

Abū Yaḥyā Salama b. Kuhayl b. Ḥusayn al-Ḥaḍramī (d. 122/740 or 123/741) was a Kūfan scholar of Ḥaḍramī origin. He witnessed Zayd b. ʿAlī’s revolt. Though he initially pledged allegiance to Zayd, he asked to be excused before the uprising, citing doubts about its success and his advanced age. He transmitted numerous ḥadīths in praise of ʿAlī, yet he also preserved a speech attributed to ʿUmar, as well as reports on the Battle of the Camel and the Tawwābūn uprising. He was held in high regard by Sunnī scholars.

Abū Yūnus Sālim b. Abī Ḥafṣa al-Tammār (d. 137 AH/754 CE) was a freed slave (mawlā) of the ʿIjl tribe, known for his strong pro-ʿAlid views. Forced into hiding during the late Umayyad period, he re-emerged under Abbasid rule and openly expressed hostility toward the fallen dynasty. Although he venerated ʿAlī, Ḥasan, and Ḥusayn, he did not actively participate in Zayd b. ʿAlī’s revolt. He was a ḥadīth transmitter and a vocal critic of a passive conception of the Imamate, advocating for a more activist role for the Imām.

Abū’l-Miqdām Thābit b. Hurmuz al-Fārisī al-Ḥaddād (120 AH/737–738 CE) was also a mawlā of the ʿIjl tribe. He is primarily noted for transmitting tafsīr from Saʿīd b. Jubayr and being cited by later scholars such as Nasāʾī. Among Shīʿī circles, he was known for preserving written material from Zayn al-ʿĀbidīn. His father was reportedly acquainted with ʿAlī, but little else is recorded about his own influence.

== Decline and Legacy ==
After years of being relentlessly pursued by the ʿAbbāsids, the Kūfan traditionalism was absorbed into Sunnism by the 9th century, and the views of the Jārūdīyya came to dominate Zaydī thought.

Despite this, the Batriyya's influence persisted in the broader development of Shīʿī and Zaydī theology. Their moderate positions on succession, legal authority, and communal knowledge reflect an important phase in the evolution of Islamic sectarianism.

== Sources ==
- Ess, Josef van. “The Zaydiyya.” Theology and Society in the Second and Third Centuries of the Hijra. A History of Religious Thought in Early Islam. Translated by John O’Kane, Brill, 2016, Volume 1, pp. 274-308, https://brill.com/display/title/31888.
- Haider, Najam. The Origins of the Shīʿa: Identity, Ritual, and Sacred Space in Eighth-Century Kūfa. Cambridge Univ. Press, 2011, pp. 200-14, https://www.cambridge.org/core/books/origins-of-the-shia/D60F837E254198FFF4F190DCE11F2D3C.
- Haider, Najam. “Zaydism.” Handbook of Islamic Sects and Movements, edited by Muhammad Afzal Upal and Carole M. Cusack, BRILL, 2021, pp. 203-11, https://brill.com/display/title/57054.
- Kontny-Wendt, Natalie. “Zaydī Rebellion in the Kitāb Al-Futūḥ of Ibn Aʿtham (Fl. around 320/932): The Case of Yaḥyā b. Zayd b. ʿAlī (d. 125/743).” Leiden Arabic Humanities Blog, 30 Aug. 2023, https://www.leidenarabichumanitiesblog.nl/articles/zaydī-rebellion-in-the-kitāb-al-futūḥ-of-ibn-aʿtham-fl-around-320-932-the-case-of-yaḥyā-b-zayd-b-ʿalī-d-125-743.
- Madelung, Wilferd. "Batriyya or Butriyya". Encyclopaedia of Islam New Edition Online (EI-2 English), P. Bearman (ed.), Brill, (2012), https://doi.org/10.1163/1573-3912_islam_SIM_8410
- Madelung, Wilferd. “Zaydiyya.” The Encyclopaedia of Islam, New Edition, edited by P. J. Bearman, Th. Bianquis, C. E. Bosworth, E. van Donzel, and Wolfhart Heinrichs, vol. XI, Brill, 2002, pp. 477-81.
- Madelung, Wilferd, and Paul Walker. An Ismaili Heresiography: The “Bāb al-Shayṭān” from Abū Tammāms’ Kitāb al-Shajara. Brill, 1998, pp. 88-94, https://brill.com/display/title/1379.
- Al Nawbakhti, Al Hasan Ibn Musa. Shīʿa Sects - Kitāb Firaq Al Shīʿa. Translated by Abbas Kadhim, ICAS Press, 2007, pp. 65-6, http://archive.org/details/ShaSectsKitibFiraqAlShSaByAlHasanIbnMusaAlNawbakhti.
- Shahrastani, Muhammad b. ’Abd al-Karim. Muslim Sects and Divisions. The Section on Muslim Sects in Kitāb al–Milal Wa al-Nihal. Translated by A. K. Kazi and J. G. Flynn, Kegan Paul International 1984, reprint New York, Routledge 2013, pp. 132-8, https://ia801208.us.archive.org/27/items/BookOfSectsAndCreedsByShahrastani/Book-of-Sects-and-Creeds-by-Shahrastani_text.pdf.
