= Abu'l-Jarud al-Hamdani =

Abu'l-Jarud Ziyad ibn al-Mundhir ibn Ziyad al-Hamdani al-Qarifi was an early Zaydi Shi'a scholar, and the namesake founder of the Zaydi branch of Jarudiyya. Born c. 700, he was blind from birth, but became a leading disciple of the Shi'a imam Muhammad al-Baqir, and is recorded as a Tabi'un transmitter of hadith and commentator of the Quran, although later Sunni and Twelver Shi'a traditions disparage him as unreliable. Abu'l-Jarud was a supporter of the failed revolt of Zayd ibn Ali in 740, and in its aftermath he refused to acknowledge al-Baqir's son, Ja'far al-Sadiq, as imam. This earned him the hostility of later Twelver Shi'a scholars, who nevertheless accept some of the traditions relayed by him, whereas Sunnis generally reject him as unreliable. He died sometime after 757/767.

== Sources ==
- Haider, Najam I. (2021). "al-Jārūdiyya". In Fleet, Kate; Krämer, Gudrun; Matringe, Denis; Nawas, John; Rowson, Everett (eds.). Encyclopaedia of Islam (3rd ed.). Brill Online. ISSN 1873-9830.
- Madelung, Wilferd (1983). "ABU'L-JĀRŪD HAMDĀNĪ". In Yarshater, Ehsan (ed.). Encyclopædia Iranica. Vol. I/3: Ablution, Islamic–Abū Manṣūr Heravı̄. London and New York: Routledge & Kegan Paul. pp. 327–328. ISBN 978-0-71009-092-8.
