= List of extinct Shia sects =

The following is a list of extinct heterodox movements within Shia Islam. These are movements that no longer have any living followers or practitioners. These movements were created around certain beliefs that were unorthodox and not held by the mainstream Shia Muslims. These movements eventually, after their very brief existence, had their followers fall into mainstream Islam.

== Ghulat sects ==
- Bazighiyya– who believed that Ja'far al-Sadiq was God.
- Dhammiyya– who believed that Ali was God and Muhammad was his appointed Messenger and Prophet.
- Ghurabiyya– who believed the angel Gabriel was mistaken.
- Hurufiyya– who believed God is incarnated in every atom, reminiscent of the Alevi-Bektashism.
  - Nuqtavi– who believed in a cyclical view of time, reminiscent of the Isma'ili Shia.
- Kaysanites– who believed in the Imamate of Muhammad ibn al-Hanafiyyah after the death of Husayn Ibn 'Ali Ibn abu Talib.
  - Bayaniyya– the followers of Bayān al-Nahdi, who believed that Abu Hashim was a prophet and would return to rule the world as Mahdi. Bayān claimed prophethood for himself after the demise of Abu Hashim, as well.
  - Harbiyya or Harithiyya– the followers of ʿAbd Allāh ibn al-Harb ibn al-Kindi, who initially taught antinomianism then joined Ibn Mu'awiya's party and later expressed many extremist views about him. Furthermore, Ibn al-Harb introduced some fundamental doctrines including metempsychosis, cyclical history of eras and aeons into the radical branch of Shi'ism. The group claimed that Abu Hashim designated Ibn Mu'awiya as his successor Imam of Hashimiyya.
    - Riyahiyya– Harbiyya and pro-Abbasid Hashimiyya disputed over Abu Hashim's will about the imamate and eventually the disputed parties agreed upon the arbitration of their respected leader Abu Riyah, who decided that the imamate should remain in Abbasids. Most of the followers of Harbiyya, who had previously recognized Ibn Mu'awiya as their imam, seceded and joined to the Abbasid party and they had been called Riyahiyya. Those who stayed in Harbiyya and continued to recognize the imamete of Ibn Mu'awiya subsequently called as Janahiyya.
    - Janahiyya– the followers of ʿAbd Allāh ibn Mu'awiya ibn ʿAbd Allāh ibn Ja'far, who was a descendant of Ja'far ibn Abi Talib known as Dhu'l-Janahayn, believed incarnation of God in a succession of Prophets and imams passing eventually through Ibn al-hanafiya and Abu Hashim to Ibn Mu'awiya; transmigration of the souls; and the allegorical interpretation of the Quran.
- Mughiriyya– who were influenced by Mandean and Manichean doctrines and were founded by the first Shi'i gnostic al-Mughira, who claimed that God is a man of light with a crown of light on his head resembling Mandean doctrine of deity referred to as "king of light". Al-Mughira further added that God has limbs corresponding to the letters of Arabic alphabet reminiscent of the teaching of Marcus the Gnostic.
- Rawandiyya– who believed in the transmigration of souls. They asserted that the spirit that was in Jesus was in Ali, and the spirit of Adam was in Othman ibn Nahik.
- Ya’furiyya– who believed in reincarnation and that Mu’ammar al-Kufi was their Lord.
- Soldiers of Heaven– who believed that their former leader Dia Abdul Zahra Kadim (died 2007 CE) was the Mahdi and reincarnation of Ali ibn Abi Talib.

== Zaydi Shia sects ==
- Mutrafya – A Hamdani-based sect of the Zaydi Shia led Mutraf bin Shihab that start gaining followers in Yemen after the fall of the Ismaili Zurayids, they were weakened by Sunni Ayyubids and later famously exterminated as heretics by the Zaydi imam Al-Mansur Abdallah for calling for backing a Hamdani imam
- Dukayniyya– who believed Muhammad's followers fell into unbelief after his death because they did not uphold the Imamate of Ali.
- Khalafiyya– who believed in a unique line of Imams after Zayd ibn Ali ibn Husayn Ibn 'Ali Ibn abu Talib, starting with a man named Abd al-Samad and continuing with his descendants.
- Khashabiyya– who believed that the Imamate must remain only among the descendants of Hasan and Husayn, even if that Imam is ignorant, immoral and tyrannical.
- Tabiriyya/Butriyya/Salihiyya– who believed the companions, including Abu Bakr, Umar and Uthman, had been in error in failing to follow Ali, but it did not amount to sin.

== Imami/pre-Twelver Shia sects ==
- Nawusiyya– who believed Ja'far al-Sadiq would return as the Mahdi.
- Fathiyya or Aftahiyya– who believed Abdallah al-Aftah was the succeeding Imam after his father Ja'far al-Sadiq's death.
- Shumaytiyya– who believed Muhammad al-Dibaj was the succeeding Imam after his father Ja'far al-Sadiq's death.
- Muhammadites– who believed that Muhammad ibn Ali al-Hadi was the true 11th Imam, rather than Hasan al-Askari.
- Tawussites– who believed that Ja'far al-Sadiq was the Mahdi and that he was alive and did not die.
- Waqifites– who believed in the Imamate of Musa al-Kadhim but refused to accept the Imamate of his successor Ali ar-Ridha.
- Musha'sha'– founded and led by Muhammad ibn Falah, an Iraqi-born theologian who believed himself to be the earthly representative of Ali and the Mahdi.
- Jaffariyya - founded by Jaffar ibn Ali al-Hadi, the youngest son of Ali al-Hadi who claimed the imamate after the death of his brother - the eleventh imam Hasan Al-Askari. He denied that his brother Al-Askari had a son. By denying the existence of the twelfth Imam Mehdi all together, claiming it was a fabrication, Jafar was known as al-Kadhdhāb ( 'the Liar'), in the Twelver Shia community.

== Ismā'īlī Shia sects ==
- Hafizi– who believed the Caliph of the Fatimid Caliphate, Al Hafiz and his descendants were also the Imam of the Time.
- Seveners– believed that Isma'il ibn Jafar was the seventh and the last Imam (hereditary leader of the Muslim community in the direct line of Ali). They believed his son, Muhammad ibn Isma'il, would return and bring about an age of justice as Mahdi.
- Qarmatians– a sect of Seveners who believed in a world view where every phenomenon repeated itself in cycles, where every incident was replayed over and over again.

== See also ==
- Islamic schools and branches
- Shi'a view of Ali

== Sources ==
- Daftary, Farhad (2007). The Ismāʿı̄lı̄s: Their History and Doctrines (Second ed.). Cambridge: Cambridge University Press. ISBN 978-0-521-61636-2.
- Madelung, Wilferd; Walker, Paul Ernest (1997). An Ismaili heresiography: the "Bāb Al-shayṭān" from Abū Tammām's Kitāb Al-shajara. BRILL. ISBN 978-90-04-11072-4.
- Momen, M. (1985). An Introduction to Shi'i Islam. Yale University Press. ISBN 9780300035315.
