= Dukayniyya Shia =

Extinct sect of Shia Islam

The Dukayniyya Shia (named for one of its leaders, Abu Nu'aym al-Fadl ibn al-Dukayn) were a sect of the Zaidi branch of Shia Islam. The Dukayniyya Shia were led by Abu Nu'aym al-Fadl ibn al-Dukayn and Ibrahim ibn al-Hakam.

== Beliefs ==
The Dukayniyya Shia had the following beliefs:

- They believed that the Imams after Muhammad were (in chronological order):
  - Ali, then
  - Hasan ibn Ali, then
  - Husayn ibn Ali, then
  - Ali ibn Husayn ibn Ali, then
  - Zayd ibn Ali ibn Husayn ibn Ali, then
  - Yahya ibn Zayd ibn Ali, then
  - The Imam is any male from the descendants of either Hassan or Husayn who arises and openly seeks the Imamate and is knowledgeable and just.
- They believed in aiding and revolting along with anyone who was opposing evil and upholding goodness.
- They believed that the world will always have an Imam and never be without one.
- They believed Muhammad’s followers fell into unbelief after his death because they did not uphold the Imamate of Ali, but instead accepted Abu Bakr as the first leader of the Muslim community after Muhammad.
- They had similar beliefs to the Jarudiyya Zaydis and the Mu'tazilites with regard to the transcendent unity of God, the "promise and threat", justice, and other doctrines.

== See also ==
- Islamic schools and branches
- List of extinct Shia sects
