= Jarudiyya =

Branch of Zaydi Islam

Jarudiyya (Arabic: الجارودية, Persian: جارودیه, romanized: Jārūdīyyah), also known as Jarudism, is among the first branches of Zaydi Islam, attributed to Abu'l-Jarud al-Hamdani. Among the theorists of the Jarudiyya are Fadl ibn Zubayr al-Rasani, Mansur ibn Abi al-Aswad, and Harun ibn Saad al-Ajli. Abu Khalid al-Wasiti is another prominent figure in this school. Jarudi beliefs include accepting Zayd ibn Ali as Imam, Ali's authority over other companions of Muhammad, and the necessity of rising against a tyrant.

== History ==
The Jarudiyya are counted as one of the first branches of Zaidism. Jozef Van Ess called this sect the "Surhubiyya". Two people had essential roles in the theoretical basics of this sect. One of them is Abu al-Jarud, the one who established this school, and the other is Abu Khalid, his heir.

== Principles ==
What we know about this sect is restricted to religious teaching, particularly the Imamate. This sect opposes other sects of Zaydism but agrees with the Twelvers about the right of succession after Muhammad as the exclusive right of Ali. Therefore, they do not believe in the succession of Abu Bakr, Umar, and Uthman. They think there is a hidden text (nass khafi) approving of Ali as the proper successor to the Prophet. According to the Jarudiyya, some traditions designate the succession of Ali. Al-Shaykh Al-Mufid believed that only Twelver Shi'ism and Jarudism deserve to be called Shi'a. They have two beliefs on the determination of a successor by the Prophet:

- One group said that Muhammad had determined Ali as successor by revealed text or nass. Ali, in turn, designated Hasan, and the latter his brother Husayn as successor.
- Another group said that the Prophet Muhammad treated a revealed text for Ali; however, the Prophet determined another revealed text for Hasan and Husayn. They believe no other revealed text exists for Imamss after the Prophet's era.

The Jarudiyya believe that Imams have innate knowledge regardless of their education. In other words, Imams have inborn knowledge from the very beginning. These beliefs are found among Yemeni Zaydis today.

== Batrī vs. Jārūdī Zaydism ==
"Batrī" and "Jārūdī" refer to theological orientations rather than distinct, identifiable groups.

The Batriyya reflect the perspectives held by most Zaydis in the early eighth century, while the Jarudiyya represents the predominant beliefs among Zaydis by the end of the ninth century.

Historians consider the supporters of Zayd ibn Ali and his son Yaḥyā to be Batri as they were Kufan traditionists (proto-Sunnī) and supported ʿAlid military uprisings and political claims.

Batrī and Jārūdī Zaydism
Batrī Zaydism:	Jārūdī Zaydism:
ʿAlī’s designation was implicit.	ʿAlī’s designation was explicit.
Opponents of ʿAlī made a mistake in reasoning. Those who took up arms repented.	Opponents of ʿAlī are apostates. Those who took up arms are also apostates.
Judgment: No cursing them or declaring them apostates.	Judgment: Cursing them and declaring them apostates is allowed.
Allows for the Imāmate of the less worthy candidate.	Restricts the Imāmate to the most worthy candidate.
Legal authority diffused in the larger Muslim community.	Legal authority restricted to the descendants of ʿAlī and Fāṭima.
Rejects the theological doctrines of rajʿa, taqiyya, and badāʾ.	Accepts the theological doctrines of rajʿa, taqiyya, and badāʾ.

Above are the main traits linked to Batrī and Jārūdī Zaydis.

=== Legitimacy of the First Two Caliphs ===
The Batrīyya accepted the legitimacy of the first two caliphs, Abū Bakr and ʿUmar ibn al-Khaṭṭāb, arguing that ʿAlī ibn Abī Ṭālib's lack of objection constituted tacit approval of their rule: "We consent to whom he consented to, for it is unlawful for us to do otherwise." In comparison to the Jārūdīyya who claimed that "anyone, who pushed ʿAlī away from that position, was blasphemous; and that the community was blasphemous and misguided when it abstained from giving the allegiance to him".

=== The Imamate ===
Zayd ibn ʿAlī explained the concept of a man of lesser excellence, or al-mafḍūl, serving as imām by noting that, although ʿAlī ibn Abī Ṭālib was the most distinguished of the Companions, the caliphate was entrusted to Abū Bakr. This decision was based on considerations of expediency, religious factors, and the fact that the people’s hearts were not yet ready to fully accept ʿAlī’s leadership at that time.

After ʿAlī and his sons al-Ḥasan and al-Ḥusayn, the imāmate was not determined by designation but by the emergence of a descendant, from either ʿAlī's sons, who was knowledgeable, just, and virtuous. The most qualified among them was considered the imām, with no room for an imām of lesser excellence. The Jārūdīyya also believed that there would always be an imām and that God's proof to humanity would never be absent. They rejected the possibility of having two imāms simultaneously, though they accepted that the current imām's identity and location could be concealed during times of dissimulation (taqiyya).

== Sources ==
- Haider, Najam I. (2021a). "al-Jārūdiyya". In Fleet, Kate; Krämer, Gudrun; Matringe, Denis; Nawas, John; Rowson, Everett (eds.). Encyclopaedia of Islam (3rd ed.). Brill Online. ISSN 1873-9830.
- Haider, Najam (2021b). "Zaydism" (PDF). Handbook of Islamic Sects and Movements. Brill Publishing. pp. 204–234. doi:10.1163/9789004435544_013. ISBN 978-90-04-43554-4.
- Madelung, W. (2002). "Zaydiyya". In Bearman, P. J.; Bianquis, Th.; Bosworth, C. E.; van Donzel, E. & Heinrichs, W. P. (eds.). The Encyclopaedia of Islam, Second Edition. Volume XI: W–Z. Leiden: E. J. Brill. pp. 477–481. doi:10.1163/1573-3912_islam_COM_1385. ISBN 978-90-04-12756-2.
- Madelung, Wilferd, and Paul Walker. An Ismaili Heresiography: The “Bāb al-Shayṭān” from Abū Tammāms’ Kitāb al-Shajara. Brill, 1998, https://brill.com/display/title/1379.
- Al Nawbakhti, Al Hasan Ibn Musa. Shīʿa Sects - Kitāb Firaq Al Shīʿa. Translated by Abbas Kadhim, ICAS Press, 2007, http://archive.org/details/ShaSectsKitibFiraqAlShSaByAlHasanIbnMusaAlNawbakhti.
- Shahrastani, Muhammad b. ’Abd al-Karim. Muslim Sects and Divisions. The Section on Muslim Sects in Kitāb al–Milal Wa al-Nihal. Translated by A. K. Kazi and J. G. Flynn, Kegan Paul International 1984, reprint New York, Routledge 2013, https://ia801208.us.archive.org/27/items/BookOfSectsAndCreedsByShahrastani/Book-of-Sects-and-Creeds-by-Shahrastani_text.pdf.
