= Lynda G. Clarke =

Canadian scholar of Islam

Lynda Clarke
- Born: 1956 (age 69–70)
- Scientific career
- Fields: Islamic Studies
- Workplaces: Concordia University
- Thesis: Early Doctrine of the Shi‘ah, according to the Shiite Sources (1995)

Lynda Gail Clarke (born 1956) is a Canadian Islamic studies scholar and Iranologist and Professor of Religions and Cultures at Concordia University. She is known for her works on Shia Islam and is a winner of Farabi International Award.

== Works ==
- Women in Niqab Speak: A Study of the Niqab in Canada, Canada: Canadian Council of Muslim Women, 2013
- Muslim and Canadian Family Law: A Comparative Primer, With P. Cross, CCMW, 2006
- Shīʻite Heritage: Essays on Classical and Modern Traditions, edited & translated with 5 introductory essays, Global Press, SUNY, 2001

== See also ==
- Bada'
