= Dhammiya =

Extinct ghulat sect of Shia Islam

Dhammiyya was a Ghulat sect within Shia Islam. The name Dhammiyya was derived from the Arabic word Dhamm, meaning blame. Therefore, the Arabic name Dhammiyya is translated as blamers. The sect was also known as the 'Ulyaniyya or 'Alya'iyya, named after ‘Ulyan (or 'Alya) ibn Dhira' as-Sadusi (or ad-Dawsi, or al-Asdi), and appear to have been active around 800 CE.

== Beliefs ==
The Dhammiyya Shia believed that Ali was God and Muhammad was his appointed Prophet. They believed that while Muhammad was the appointed Prophet of Ali and acknowledged him to be God, he called for the worship of Allah and deceived people into thinking that Allah was God instead of Ali. They believed that Muhammad was sinful for doing so, and worthy of blame- from which the Dhammiyya get their name. They also believed that Fatima, the child of Muhammad, was a male and not a female.

Some of the Dhammiyya Shia had the following beliefs:

- A group of the Dhammiyya believed that both Muhammad and Ali were divine, therefore, they held Muhammad and Ali as equals.
- A group of the Dhammiyya believed that Muhammad, Ali, Fatimah, Hasan ibn Ali and Husayn ibn Ali, who are in one overcoat, and make up one unity.
  - The same one spirit exists in all 5 of them at the same time.
  - All 5 of them have no superiority over one another.

== See also ==
- Islamic schools and branches
- List of extinct Shia sects
