= Rawandiyya =

Al-Rawandiyya or Rawandians is a term referring to a minority sect of Shi'i origin that originated in Khorasan during the Abbasid rule. The term was later expanded to include the entire Abbasid Shi'a community. The etymology is said to derive from Al-Kasim ibn Rawand or from Abu'l Abbas al-Rawandi, but little is known about these individuals. Other sources claim that the name is derived from Abd Allah al-Rawandi. Accounts by later historians and heresiographers claim that the Rawandiyya held numerous doctrines, some of which suggest belief in metempsychosis and divine incarnation, contrary to mainstream Shi'a doctrines.

== Revolt against the Abbasids ==
The Abbasid Caliphate drew upon the Rawandians for support during the clandestine and revolutionary phases of their movement; but once in power, the caliphs attempted to distance themselves from the group due to the unconventional beliefs contained within the group's religious doctrines. In 757 AD, Caliph al-Mansur confronted a group of Rawandians that claimed he was their God or rabb while performing circumambulation around his palace. The confrontation turned violent, but al-Mansur was graciously saved by Ma'n ibn Za'ida al-Shaybani, a former Umayyad general who went into hiding after the Abbasid Revolution. It is said that following this event, al-Mansur founded Baghdad where he fixed his after residence.
