= Khalafiyya Shia =

Subsect of the Zaidi branch of Shia Islam

The Khalafiyya Shia (named for its founder Khalaf ibn Abd al-Samad) were a subsect of the Zaidi branch of Shia Islam.

== Beliefs ==
The Khalafiyya Shia had the following beliefs:

- They believed that the Imams after Zayd ibn Ali ibn Husayn ibn Ali ibn Abī Ṭālib are as follows (in chronological order):
  - Abd al-Samad (a client of Zayd ibn Ali, although the Khalafiyya Shia claim he was a son of Zayd), then
  - Khalaf ibn Abd al-Samad (who fled from the Umayyads to the land of the Turks), then
  - Muhammad ibn Khalaf ibn Abd al-Samad, then
  - Ahmad ibn Muhammad ibn Khalaf ibn Abd al-Samad, then
  - The Khalafiyya Shia did not know the names of the Imams after Ahmad, but they believed that a descendant of Ahmad, still residing in the land of the Turks (since the migration to that land of his ancestor Khalaf ibn Abd al-Samad), would rise as the Mahdi.
- They believed the Imam’s knowledge comes to him by inspiration, not by acquisition.
- They believed the Imam understood all languages.
- They believed that Khalaf ibn Abd al-Samad left behind a book which he composed in letters of an alphabet unknown to anyone other than his successor Imams and that these Imams alone would be able to explain his book.
- They believed in a doctrine of Tawhid (Oneness of God) which denies that a person can describe or characterize God in any way. For example:
  - a person cannot say that God is knowing, or that God is not knowing.
  - a person cannot say that God is powerful, or that God is not powerful.
  - a person cannot say that God is a thing, or that God is not a thing.
- They also believed in a devotion to fives. For example (according to them):
  - 5 primary angels; Mikha’il (the chief angel of the Khalafiyya), Jibra’il, Izra’il, Mika’il and Israfil
  - 5 chosen creatures on Earth; Muhammad, Ali, Fatimah, Hasan ibn Ali and Husayn ibn Ali
  - 5 fingers
  - 5 pillars of Islam; Shahadah, Salat, Zakat, Sawm and Hajj
  - 5 senses; hearing, sight, touch, smell, and taste
  - 5 prayer times; Fajr (Dawn prayer), Dhuhr (Mid-day prayer), Asr (Afternoon prayer), Maghrib (Sunset prayer) and Isha'a (Night prayer)
  - 5 books of scripture; the Suhuf Ibrahim (commonly the Scrolls of Abraham), the Tawrat (Torah), the Zabur (commonly the Psalms), the Injil (commonly the Gospel), and the Qur'an
  - 5 things leading to salvation
  - 5 special months of the year; Muharram, Rajab, Ramadan, Dhu al-Qi'dah and Dhu al-Hijjah

== See also ==
- Islamic schools and branches
- List of extinct Shia sects

== Bibliography ==
- Mediaeval Isma'ili History and Thought, By Farhad Daftary, pg.173-74
