= Bazighiyya Shia =

Extinct Ghulat sect of Shia Islam

The Bazighiyya Shia (named for Bazigh ibn Yunus, to whom they were related) was a Ghulat sect of Shia Islam. They believed that Ja’far ibn Muhammad al-Sādiq was God. The sect eventually dissolved as its adherents converted to mainstream Twelver Shia Islam.

== Beliefs ==
The Bazighiyya Shia had the following beliefs:

- They believed the Imams after Muhammad are (in chronological order):
  - Ali, then
  - Hasan ibn Ali, then
  - Husayn ibn Ali, then
  - Alī ibn Ḥusayn Zayn al-Abidin, then
  - Muḥammad ibn ‘Alī al-Baqir
- They believed that Ja'far al-Sadiq (who succeeded his father Muhammad al-Baqir) was not an Imam, but God Himself.
- They believed Ja'far al-Sadiq commands the Bazighiyya Shi’ites the acts of the inhabitants of heaven.
- They believed God does not look like Ja'far al-Sadiq, but He merely presents Himself to the people in Ja'far's form.
- They believed the Imams after Ja'far al-Sadiq, like the Imams before him, are not gods.
- They believed that everything that is born in their hearts is revelation.
- They believed that every Bazighiyya Shi’ite receives revelation. To support their belief they used as evidence the words of God in the Qur’an:
  - “Nor can a soul die except by the leave of God” and
  - “And your Lord inspired the bee” and
  - “And behold, I inspired the disciples to have faith in Me.”
- They believed there are among them some who are better than the angels Gabriel and Michael, and the prophets Abraham and Muhammad.
- They believed that no Bazighiyya Shi’ite will die. Rather, when one of them reaches perfection in his devotion, he is taken up to the heavenly kingdom.
- They believed they have seen those of them that are deceased, and that they see them in the morning and evening.

== See also ==
- Islamic schools and branches
- List of extinct Shia sects
