= Alid revolt =

An Alid revolt (Arabic: ثورة العلويين, romanized: Thawrat al-ʿAlawiyyīn) can refer to any rebellion by Alid partisans against the Umayyad and Abbasid caliphates:

- Battle of Karbala, Alid revolt by Husayn ibn Ali that was brutally suppressed and led to the Second Fitna
- Alid revolts during the Second Fitna, against the Umayyads, suppressed in the Battle of 'Ayn al-Warda and the Battle of Harura
- Revolts of Zayd ibn Ali, against the Umayyads
- Alid revolt of 762–763 in Medina and Basra, against the Abbasids
- Alid revolt of 786 in Mecca, against the Abbasids, suppressed in the Battle of Fakhkh

== See also ==
- Alid dynasties of northern Iran
