= Yaʽfuriyya Shia =

Sect of Shia Islam

The Yaʽfuriyya Shia (named for Muhammad ibn Yaʽfur, to whom they were related) was a ghulat sect of Shia Islam. The sect was also referred to as the Muʽammariyya Shia. The Yaʽfuriyya believed in reincarnation and a man named Muʽammar al-Kufi to be their Lord.

== Beliefs ==
The Ya’furiyya Shia had the following beliefs:

- They believed that the Imams after Muhammad were (in chronological order):
  - Ali, then
  - Hasan ibn Ali, then
  - When Hasan ibn Ali pledged allegiance to Muawiyah I, the Imamate was taken away from him and given to Husayn ibn Ali
  - Ali ibn Husayn Zayn al-Abidin
  - Muhammad al-Baqir
  - The Ya’furiyya Shia do not know the names of the Imams after Muhammad al-Baqir, other than a few.
- They believed the world will always have an Imam and never be without one.
  - They believed that anyone who denies and rejects the Imams (even one Imam) is an unbeliever.
  - They believed that anyone who acknowledges and accepts all the Imams and knows their names is a believer.
  - They believed that anyone who acknowledges all the Imams but does not know all or some of their names is neither a believer nor an unbeliever.
- They believed that a man called Mu’ammar al-Kufi was their Lord.
  - They did homage to Mu’ammar al-Kufi morning and evening.
  - When Mu’ammar al-Kufi died, they said about him what the Christians say about Jesus.
- They believed in metempsychosis.
  - They believed the world will go on forever.
  - They believed that Paradise is whatever befalls the people in this world in the way of well-being, blessings, possessions, money and fame.
  - They believed that Hell is whatever befalls the people in this world in the way of diseases, ill-health, hardship and transmigration of spirits into the beasts, birds and insects. The Ya’furiyya's proof for this belief of theirs was the words of God in the Quran: "There is not an animal that lives on the earth nor a creature that flies on its wings but forms a community that is like yours."
- They believed that adultery, wine, amusements and all the other things forbidden in Islam to be lawful. According to the Ya’furiyya, the reason why Muhammad forbade these amusements and rewards was to prevent the Muslims from then thinking that they had achieved their reward in its complete entirety. This would have then made the Muslims commit fewer acts that would be worthy of the true worldly rewards (by way of the distractions of the amusements and rewards), and more acts that would result in the worldly punishments and transmigration of spirits into beast and reptiles. It would have also required the Muslims to work harder and do more good deeds to maintain their deserving position of the worldly rewards.

== See also ==
- Islamic schools and branches
- List of extinct Shia sects

== Bibliography ==
- An Ismaili heresiography: the "Bāb al-shayṭān" from Abū Tammām's Kitāb al ..., By Wilferd Madelung, Paul Ernest Walker, pgg.104-105
