= Tawussite Shia =

Former Shia group

The Tawussite Shia (attributed to ʿAjlan ibn Tawus) were a Shia group who were a section of the supporters of Imam Ja'far al-Sadiq who denied that he died. They believed that he was the awaited Mahdi and that he was alive.

After the death of Imam Muhammad al-Baqir, the defeat of Muhammad ibn Abdallah an-Nafs az-Zakiyya, the triumph of the Abbasids, and the popularity of Imam Ja'far al-Sadiq, reports became widespread on his Mahdism. Al-Nubakhti reports that: “Some Shiites (i.e. Tawussites) have reported (falsely) from Imam Sadiq that he said: ‘If you see my head rolling to you from the mountain, you should not believe that, for I am your Sahib (Mahdi)’” and: “If anyone informs you that he nursed me, washed my body (after death) and shrouded me, do not believe him, I am your companion (Sahib) and the companion of the sword.”

Among the Tawussites was Aban ibn Uthman al-Ahmar, who was considered by Shia scholar al-Kashi to have been one of the men of Ijma (consensus), i.e. one of the supposed closest people to Imam Sadiq.

== See also ==
- Islamic schools and branches
- List of extinct Shia sects
