= Khashabiyya Shia =

Extinct sect of the Zaidi branch of Shia Islam

The Khashabiyya Shia (named for their exclusive use of pieces of wood as weapons in their revolt against the Umayyads under the leadership of Al-Mukhtar) are an extinct subsect of the Zaidi branch of Shia Islam. They originated as followers of Al-Mukhtar and hence would have been expected to be categorized under the Kaysanite Shia sect. The Khashabiyya Shia were later known in Khurasan as the Surkhabiyya (named for their leader Surkhab al-Tabari).

== Beliefs ==
The Khashabiyya Shia had the following beliefs:

- They believed that Ali was the legatee of Muhammad and not an Imam, but merely the executor (Wasi) of the Imamate that Muhammad had deposited with him until he could pass it on to his son Hasan.
- The Imamate will remain only among the descendants of Hasan ibn Ali and Husayn ibn Ali.
- The Imamate may reside in any one of the descendants of Hasan and Husayn who rises in revolt.
- The "Imam" can be knowledgeable or ignorant, the most excellent or of lesser qualities, righteous or immoral, just or tyrannical.
- The "Imam" must be fully obeyed and never opposed, no matter who he is.
- If two people claim the Imamate at the same time or two of them fight one another, no one should take sides in the struggle between them or provide any assistance to one of them against the other, regardless of whether they are both tyrannical, or both just, or mutual opposites.

== See also ==
- Islamic schools and branches
- List of extinct Shia sects

== Bibliography ==
- Mediaeval Isma'ili History and Thought, By Farhad Daftary, pg.172
- An Ismaili heresiography: the "Bāb al-shayṭān" from Abū Tammām's Kitāb al ..., By Wilferd Madelung, Paul Ernest Walker, pg.91
