= Zaydism =

Branch of Shia Islam

- الزيدية (Arabic) az-Zaydiyyah
- Al-Imam al Hadi Mosque is a mosque dedicated to the Zaydi Imam, Al-Hadi ila'l-Haqq Yahya. Most famous due to his efforts in formalizing the Zaydi school of thought.
- Type: School of Islam
- Classification: Shia Islam
- Theology: Meritocratic Imamate
- Imam: Officially Vacant (since 1962)
- Region: Yemen (Northern western Yemen/Yemeni Highlands); Saudi Arabia (Najran/Southern highlands)
- Territory: Northwestern Yemen (governed de facto by the Houthis)
- Founder: Zayd ibn Ali
- Origin: c. 740 CE; Kufa
- Members: 15-20 million

Zaydism (Arabic: الزَّيْدِيَّة, romanized: az-Zaydiyyah), also referred to as Fiver Shi'ism, is a branch of Shia Islam, and sometimes considered the fifth school of Sunni law, that emerged in the eighth century following Zayd ibn Ali's unsuccessful rebellion against the Umayyad Caliphate. Zaydism is one of the currently three main branches of Shi'ism, the other two being Twelverism and Ismailism.

Zaydism is typically considered the Shia branch that is closest to Sunni Islam, although the "classical" form of Zaydism (usually referred to as Hadawi) historically changed its stance on Sunni and Shia traditions multiple times, to the point where Zaydis' simply accepting Ali as a rightful successor to Muhammad was enough to consider them Shia.

Zaydis regard rationalism as more important than Quranic literalism and historically were quite tolerant towards Shafi'i Sunnism, the jurisprudential school of more than half of the Yemenis. Most of the world's Zaydis are located in northwestern Yemen and Najran in Saudi Arabia.

== History ==
=== Origins ===
In the 7th century, some early Muslims expected Ali to become the first caliph of the Rashidun Caliphate, successor to Muhammad. After the ascension of Abu Bakr, the supporters of Ali (and future Shia) continued to believe only people from Muhammad's family qualify as rulers. They selected an imam from each generation of Muhammad's family. (The proto-Sunni, in contrast, recognized Abu Bakr as a legitimate first caliph). The Zaydis emerged in reverence of Zayd ibn Ali's failed uprising against the Umayyad caliph Hisham ibn Abd al-Malik (r. 724–743). While a majority of the early Shia recognized Zayd's brother, Muhammad al-Baqir, as the fifth leader, some considered Zayd as the fifth imam, and thus in the 8th century formed the Zaydi or "Fivers" offshoot of Islam.

Since the earliest form of Zaydism was Jaroudiah, many of the first Zaydi states were supporters of its position, such as those of the Iranian Alavids of Mazandaran province, the Buyid dynasty of Gilan province, the Arab dynasties of the Banu Ukhaidhir of al-Yamama (modern Saudi Arabia), and the Rassids of Yemen. The Idrisid dynasty in the western Maghreb were another Arab Zaydi dynasty, ruling 788–985.

Some Persian and Arab legends record that Zaydis fled to China from the Umayyads during the 8th century.

=== Zaydi empires in Iran ===
Under Hasan ibn Zayd, the Alavids established a Zaydi state in Daylam and Tabaristan (northern Iran) in 864. It also expanded into Sa'dah (Yemen) around 893, under al-Hadi ila'l-Haqq Yahya, a descendant of Imam Hasan ibn Ali; Yahya thereby founded the Rassid dynasty. The Zaydi state in Tabaristan lasted until the death of its leader at the hand of the Sunni Samanids in 928. Roughly forty years later, the state was revived in Daylam and Gilan (northwest Iran) and survived until 1126. Historically, there was a small community of Zaydi Kurds between Iran and Iraq.

After Marzuban ibn Justan converted to Islam in 805, the ancient family of Justan's became connected to the Zaydi Alids of the Daylam region. Thus the rulers of Daylam were also called the Justanids (Persian: جستانیان).

The Buyid dynasty was initially Zaydi as were the Banu Ukhaidhir rulers of al-Yamama in the 9th and 10th centuries. The leader of the Zaydi community took the title of Caliph. As such, the ruler of Yemen was known as the Caliph. From the 12th to the 13th century, Zaydi communities acknowledged the Imams of Yemen or rival Imams within Iran.

The Karkiya dynasty, or Kia dynasty, was a Zaydi Shia dynasty which ruled over Bia pish (eastern Gilan) from the 1370s to 1592. They claimed Sasanian ancestry as well.

The Zaydis on the Caspian Sea were forcefully converted to Twelver Shi'ism in the 16th century.

=== Outside Arabia and Iran ===
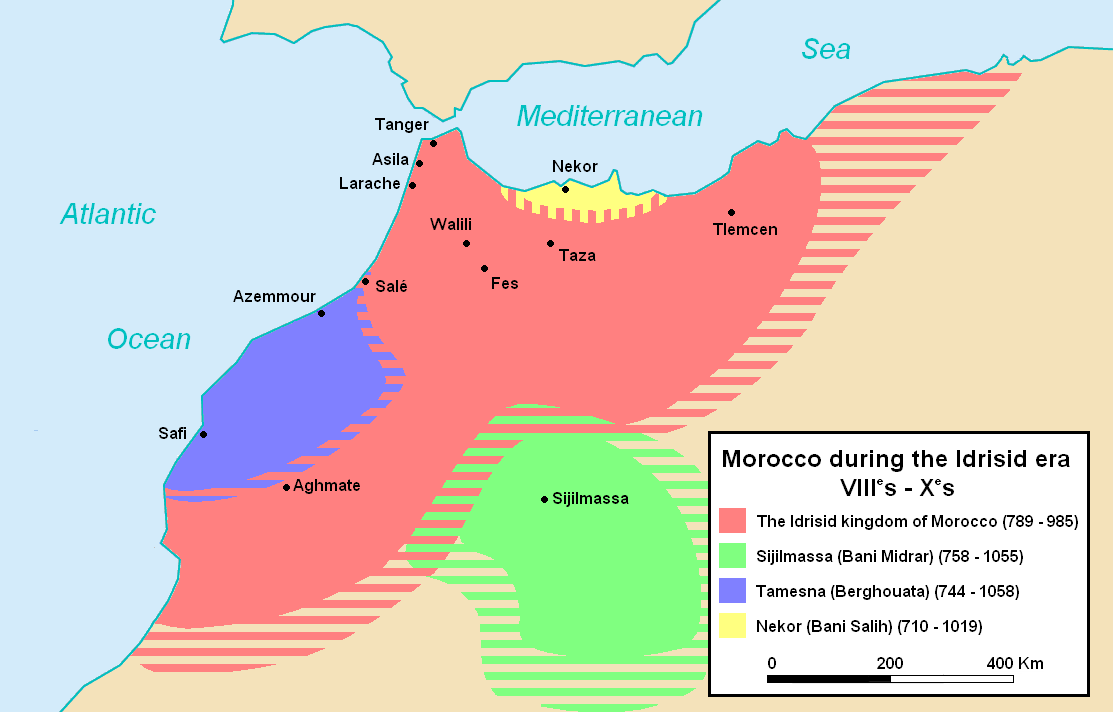
Extent of Zaydi dynasty in North Africa.

The Idrisid dynasty was a Zaydi dynasty centered around modern-day Morocco which ruled from 788 to 974. It was named after its first leader Idris I.

The Hammudid dynasty was a Zaydi dynasty in the 11th century in southern Spain.

=== Evolution of the Zaydi Imamate in Yemen ===
The Zaydis in Yemen had initially lived in the highlands and the northern territories, but the extent of their dominance away from their capital of seven centuries, Sa'dah, had been changing over time. The Rassid dynasty was re-established under Al-Mansur al-Qasim after an Ottoman invasion in the 16th century. After another conflict with the Ottomans, a new succession line was started in the 19th century by Muhammad bin Yahya Hamid ad-Din. With minor interruptions, these two dynasties ruled in Yemen until the creation of the Yemen Arab Republic in 1962.

The Rassid state had been founded under Jarudiyya thought; however, increasing interactions with Hanafi and Shafi'i schools of Sunni Islam led to a shift to Sulaimaniyyah thought, especially among the Hadawi sub-sect. While the rulers ostensibly conformed to Hadawi law (thus the "imamate"), the doctrines had to be modified to allow hereditary, as opposed to traditional merit-based, selection of imams.

This transition did not happen abruptly, but through a long-lasting process from the fifteenth century onwards (termed "Traditionism" by Bernard Haykel) that saw the gradual merging of Zaydi doctrine with elements of Shafi'i Sunnism. By the mid-eighteenth century, the rulers of the Qasimi Imamate had become dynastic, a more formal state bureaucracy was established, and the traditional Zaydi notion of khurūj (revolt against unjust rule) was deemed unacceptable.

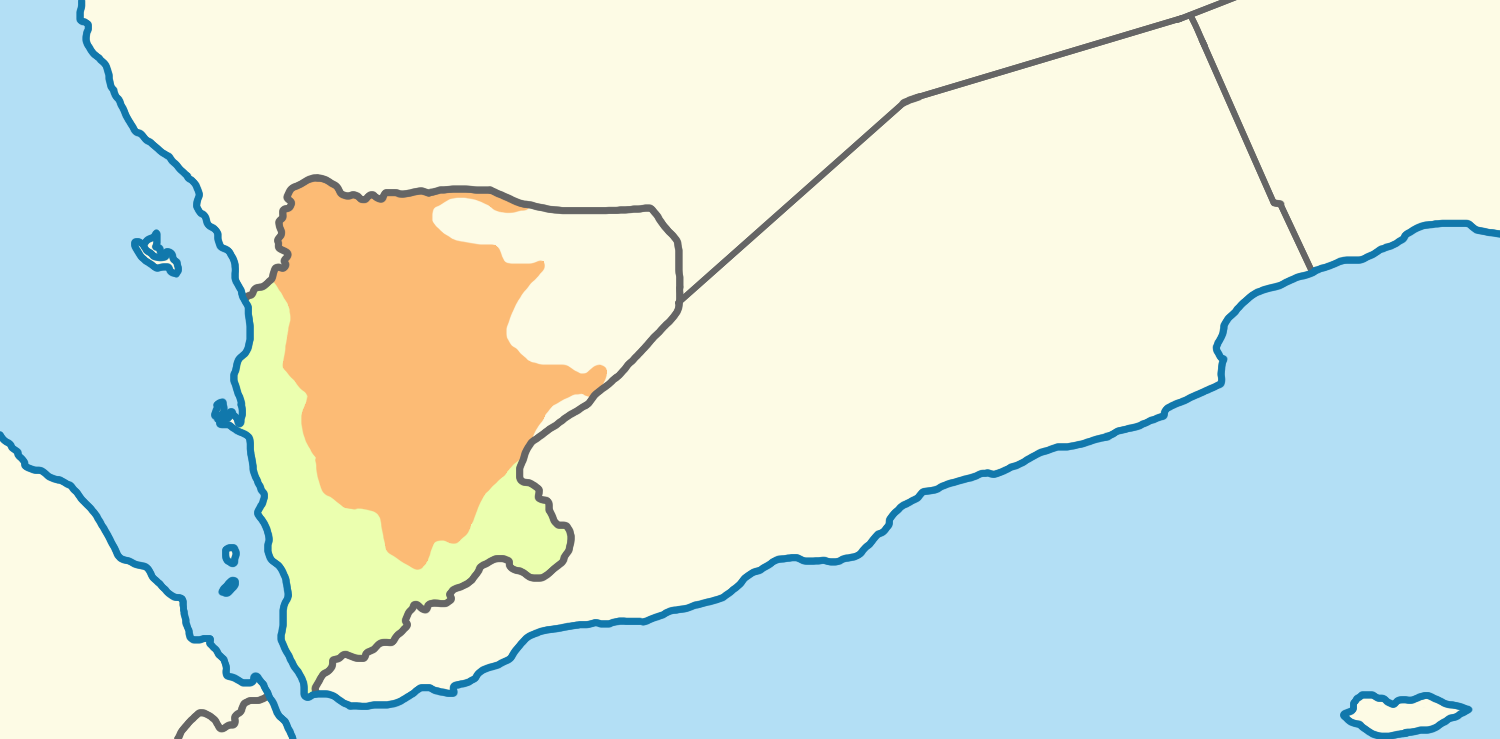
Zaydi regions (orange) in Yemen's interior, excludes Tihamah on the coast.

The Mutawakkilite Kingdom of Yemen, also known as North Yemen, existed between 1918 and 1962 in the northern part of what is now Yemen. Its capital was Sanaa until 1948, then Taiz.

=== Yemeni Arab Republic era ===
After the fall of the Zaydi Imamate in 1962 some Zaydi Shia in northern Yemen converted to Sunni Islam.

The end of imam rule, with the new rulers in Yemen no longer conforming to the requirements of Zaydism, caused a number of Zaydi scholars to call for the restoration of the imamate. This contributed to the North Yemen Civil War that lasted from 1962 to 1970. The national reconciliation of 1970 paused the fighting with traumatized Zaydis following three main routes:

- joining the new political system (the religious Party of Truth was created in 1990);
- restoring the spiritual and cultural heritage of Zaydism by opening religious centers and encouraging the tribes to send their youth for education there;
- preparing for the future fighting (Houthi movement founder Hussein al-Houthi was readying the militia).

Throughout the Republican era, the position of Saudi-backed Salafis and other Sunni groups in Yemen steadily increased, as did the position of Sheikhs who sometimes cooperated with these Salafi groups for pragmatic reasons. The Salafis reportedly pursued an aggressive "policy of provocation" towards the Zaydis who inhabited the surrounding area, often accusing them of apostasy and sometimes even destroying their cemeteries. Despite this, the Salafi school enjoyed the support of both the Saudi and North Yemeni regimes. This situation helped sow the seeds for mounting discontent among the Zaydi population and ultimately Zaydi revivalist movements such as the Houthis, an armed rebel group.

=== Houthi insurgency ===
Since 2004, the Houthis have been waging an uprising against factions belonging to the Sunni majority group in the country. The group has asserted that their actions are for the defence of their community from the government and discrimination, though the Yemeni government in turn accused them of wishing to bring it down and institute religious law.

On 21 September 2014, an agreement was signed in Sanaa under UN patronage essentially giving the Houthis control of the government after a decade of conflict. Tribal militias then moved swiftly to consolidate their position in the capital, with the group officially declaring direct control over the state on 6 February 2015. This outcome followed the removal of Yemen's President Ali Abdullah Saleh in 2012 in the wake of protracted Arab Spring protests. Saudi Arabia has exercised the predominant external influence in Yemen since the withdrawal of Nasser's Egyptian expeditionary force marking the end of the bitter North Yemen Civil War.

There is a wide array of domestic opponents to Houthi rule in Yemen, ranging from the conservative Sunni Islah Party to the secular post-socialist Southern Movement to the radical Islamists of Al Qaeda in the Arabian Peninsula and, since 2014, the Islamic State – Yemen Province.

== Law ==
In matters of Islamic jurisprudence, the Zaydis follow Zayd ibn Ali's teachings, which are documented in his book Majmu' Al-Fiqh (Arabic: مجموع الفِقه). Zaydi fiqh is similar to the Hanafi school of Sunni Islamic jurisprudence, as well as the Ibadi school. Abu Hanifa, the founder of the Hanafi school, was favorable and even donated towards the Zaydi cause. Zaydis dismiss religious dissimulation (taqiyya). Zaydism does not rely heavily on hadith, but uses those that are consistent with the Qur'an, and is open to hadith. Some sources argue that Zaydism is simply a philosophy of political government that justifies the overthrow of unjust rulers and prioritizes those who are Ahl al-Bayt.

== Theology ==
Haider states that mainstream Zaydism (Hadawi) is a result of the interaction of two currents, Batrism and Jarudism, their followers brought together during the original revolts of Zayd ibn Ali. The names, also designated as Batri and Jarudi, do not necessarily represent cohesive groups of people; for example, Batri ideas (proto-Sunni) were dominant among Zaydis in the 8th century, and Jarudism (Shia) took over in the 9th century. The following table summarizes the differences between Batri and Jarudi beliefs per Haider:

Batri vs. Jarudi
Batri	Jarudi
Muhammad implicitly designated Ali as a caliph.	Ali was clearly named by Muhammad.
Ali's opponents were victims of bad judgement. They should not be cursed or declared apostates.	Ali's opponents were apostates and can be cursed.
Imamate can go to a less worthy candidate.	Only the most worthy candidate shall become an imam.
Legal authority is vested in the entire Muslim community.	Only Ali's and Fatima's descendants have legal authority.
Doctrines of raj'a, taqiyya, and bada' are invalid.	Raj'a, taqiyya, and bada' are accepted.

Zaydis' theological literature emphasizes social justice and human responsibility and their political implications—i.e., Muslims have an ethical and legal obligation by their religion to rise up and depose unjust leaders, including unrighteous sultans and caliphs. By the modern day, Batrism and many other sects of Zaydism went extinct, leaving the Jarudi branch as the only surviving group, represented in the modern day Hadawi school. While the Batriyyah sect is extinct, some forms of their theology were integrated to mainstream Zaydi theology, for example, the idea that Muhammad implicitly designated Ali as the caliph, and the rejection of doctrines like Raj'a, taqiyya, and bada'. However, it rejects the Batri idea that legal authority is vested in the entire Muslim community, and keeps that only the most worthy candidate shall be the Imam.

The Houthi movement however is reforming the original Jarudi creed contemporary of the environment around them, and influence by Twelverism led to revived beliefs of original Jarudi creed in Houthi controlled areas and explicit doctrines that Ali is explicitly designated by Muhammad.

=== Beliefs ===
Zaydis believe Zayd ibn Ali was the rightful successor to the imamate because he led a rebellion against the Umayyad Caliphate, which he believed was tyrannical and corrupt. Muhammad al-Baqir did not engage in political action, and the followers of Zayd believed that a true Imām must fight against corrupt rulers. The renowned Muslim jurist Abu Hanifa, who is credited with founding the Hanafi school of Sunni Islam, delivered a fatwā or legal statement in favour of Zayd in his rebellion against the Umayyad ruler. He also secretly urged people to join the uprising and delivered funds to Zayd.

Unlike Twelver and Isma'ili Shi'ism, Zaydis do not believe in the infallibility of Imams and reject the notion of nass imamate, but believe that an Imam can be any descendant of Hasan ibn Ali or Husayn ibn Ali. Zaydis believe that Zayd ibn Ali, in his last hour, was betrayed by the people in Kufa.

Zaydis reject anthropomorphism and instead take a rationalist approach to scriptural uses of anthropomorphic expressions, as illustrated in works such as the Kitāb al-Mustarshid by the 9th-century Zaydi imam al-Qasim al-Rassi.

== Status of Caliphs and the Sahaba ==
There was a difference of opinion among the companions and supporters of Zayd ibn 'Ali, such as Abu al-Jarud Ziyad ibn Abi Ziyad, Sulayman ibn Jarir, Kathir al-Nawa al-Abtar and Hasan ibn Salih, concerning the status of the first three Rashidun caliphs who succeeded to the political and administrative authority of Muhammad. The earliest group, called Jarudiyya (named for Abu'l-Jarud al-Hamdani), was opposed to the approval of certain companions of Muhammad. They held that there was sufficient description given by Muhammad that all should have recognized Ali as the rightful caliph. They therefore consider the companions wrong in failing to recognise Ali as the legitimate Caliph and deny legitimacy to Abu Bakr, Umar and Uthman; however, they avoid accusing them.

The Jarudiyya were active during the late Umayyad Caliphate and early Abbasid Caliphate. Its views, although predominant among the later Zaydis, especially in Yemen under the Hadawi sub-sect, became extinct in Iraq and Iran due to forced conversion of the present religious sects to Twelver Shi'ism by the Safavid dynasty.

The second group, the Sulaymaniyya, named for Sulayman ibn Jarir, held that the Imamate should be a matter to be decided by consultation. They felt that the companions, including Abu Bakr and 'Umar, had been in error in failing to follow 'Ali, but it did not amount to sin.

The third group is known as the Batriyya, Tabiriyya, or Salihiyya for Kathir an-Nawa al-Abtar and Hasan ibn Salih. Their beliefs are virtually identical to those of the Sulaymaniyya, except they see Uthman also as in error but not in sin.

The term rāfiḍa was a term used by Zayd ibn Ali on those who rejected him in his last hours for his refusal to condemn the first two Caliphs of the Muslim world, Abu Bakr and Umar. Zayd bitterly scolds the "rejectors" (rāfiḍa) who deserted him, an appellation used by Salafis to refer to Twelver Shi'a to this day.

A group of their leaders assembled in his (Zayd's presence) and said: "May God have mercy on you! What do you have to say on the matter of Abu Bakr and Umar?" Zayd said, "I have not heard anyone in my family renouncing them both nor saying anything but good about them...when they were entrusted with government they behaved justly with the people and acted according to the Qur'an and the Sunnah"

According to Zaydi traditions, Rāfiḍa referred to those Kufans who deserted and refused to support Zayd ibn Ali, who had a favourable view of the first two Rashidun Caliphs. The term "Rāfiḍa" became a popular pejorative term used by the Zaydi scholars against Imami Shias to criticize their rejection of Zayd ibn Ali.

Twelver Shias sometimes consider Zaydism to be a "fifth school" of Sunni Islam.

=== Twelver Shia references to Zayd ===
While not one of the Twelve Imams embraced by Twelver Shi'ism, Zayd ibn Ali features in historical accounts within Twelver literature in a positive and negative light.

In Twelver accounts, Imam Ali al-Ridha narrated how his grandfather, Ja'far al-Sadiq, also supported Zayd ibn Ali's struggle:

he was one of the scholars from the Household of Muhammad and got angry for the sake of the Honorable the Exalted God. He fought with the enemies of God until he got killed in His path. My father Musa ibn Ja’far narrated that he had heard his father Ja’far ibn Muhammad say, "May God bless my uncle Zayd... He consulted with me about his uprising and I told him, "O my uncle! Do this if you are pleased with being killed and your corpse being hung up from the gallows in the al-Konasa neighbourhood." After Zayd left, As-Sadiq said, "Woe be to those who hear his call but do not help him!".

— Uyūn Akhbār al-Riḍā, p. 466

Jafar al-Sadiq's love for Zayd ibn Ali was so immense that he broke down and cried upon reading the letter informing him of his death and proclaimed:

From God we are and to Him is our return. I ask God for my reward in this calamity. He was a really good uncle. My uncle was a man for our world and for our Hereafter. I swear by God that my uncle is a martyr just like the martyrs who fought along with God’s Prophet or Ali or Al-Hassan or Al-Hussein

— Uyūn akhbār al-Riḍā, p. 472

However, in other hadiths, narrated in Al-Kafi, the main Shia book of hadith, Zayd ibn Ali is criticized by his half-brother, Imam Muhammad al-Baqir, for his revolt against the Umayyad Dynasty. According to Alexander Shepard, an Islamic Studies specialist, much of Twelver hadith and theology was written to counter Zaydism.

== See also ==
- Zaydi Imams of Yemen
- Dukayniyya Shia
- Khalafiyya Shia
- Khashabiyya Shia
- Islamic history of Yemen
- Zaidi (surname)
