= Metempsychosis =

Transmigration of the soul

In philosophy and theology, metempsychosis (Ancient Greek: μετεμψύχωσις) is the transmigration of the soul, especially its reincarnation after death. The term is derived from ancient Greek philosophy, and has been recontextualized by modern philosophers such as Arthur Schopenhauer, Kurt Gödel, Mircea Eliade, and Magdalena Villaba; otherwise, the word "transmigration" is more appropriate. The word plays a prominent role in James Joyce's Ulysses and is also associated with Friedrich Nietzsche. Another term sometimes used synonymously is palingenesis.

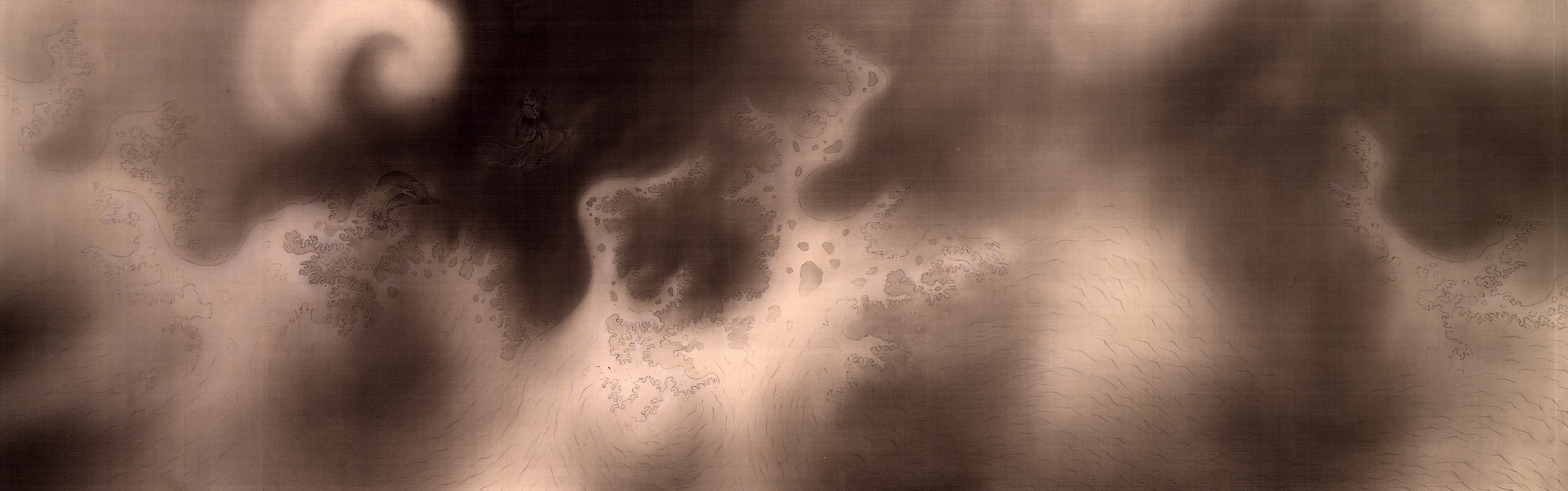
A section of Metempsychosis (1923) by Yokoyama Taikan; a drop of water from the vapours in the sky transforms into a mountain stream, which flows into a great river and on into the sea, whence rises a dragon (pictured) that turns back to vapour; National Museum of Modern Art, Tokyo (Important Cultural Property)

== Orphism ==
A belief in metempsychosis has been associated with Orphism, the name given to a religious movement said in antiquity to have been founded by the legendary poet Orpheus. Orphism is said to hold that soul and body are united by a contract unequally binding on either. The soul is divine but immortal and aspires to freedom, while the body holds it in fetters as a prisoner. Death dissolves that contract but only to reimprison the liberated soul after a short time, for the wheel of birth revolves inexorably. Thus, the soul continues its journey and alternates between a separate unrestrained existence and a fresh reincarnation around the wide circle of necessity, as the companion of many bodies of men and animals. To those unfortunate prisoners, Orpheus proclaims the message of liberation, that they stand in need of the grace of redeeming gods, Dionysus in particular, and calls them to turn to the gods by ascetic piety and self-purification: the purer their lives, the higher their next reincarnation will be, until the soul has completed the spiral ascent of destiny to live forever as a God from whom it comes.

== Pre-Socratic philosophy ==
The earliest Greek thinker with whom metempsychosis is connected is Pherecydes of Syros, but Pythagoras, who is said to have been his pupil, is its first famous philosophic exponent. Walter Burkert has argued that Pythagoras may have introduced metempsychosis to Orphism. He suggests that modern scholarship's tendency to separate Orphism from early Pythagoreanism is a retrojection, possibly of Nietzschean ideas about the opposition of the Apollonian (associated with Pythagoreanism) and the Dionysian (associated with Orphism), whereas for the Greeks, Apollo and Dionysus were brothers and not so clearly differentiated. Pythagoras offered as evidence for metempsychosis his own recollection of past lives, a superhuman form of wisdom that contributed to his reputation as a prophet.

== Platonic philosophy ==
The weight and importance of metempsychosis in the Western tradition are from its adoption by Plato. In the eschatological myth that closes the Republic, he tells how Er, the son of Armenius, miraculously returned to life on the twelfth day after death and recounted the secrets of the other world. After death, he said, he went with others to the place of Judgment and saw the souls returning from heaven, and proceeded with them to a place where they chose new lives, human and animal. He saw the soul of Orpheus changing into a swan, Thamyras becoming a nightingale, musical birds choosing to be men, and Atalanta choosing the honours of an athlete. Men were seen passing into animals and wild and tame animals changing into each other. After their choice, the souls drank of Lethe and then shot away like stars to their birth. There are myths and theories to the same effect in other dialogues, including the Phaedrus, Meno, Phaedo, Timaeus, and Laws. In Plato's view the number of souls was fixed; souls are never created or destroyed but only transmigrate from one body to another. Origen's doctrine of the preexistence of souls was close to Plato's idea of metempsychosis and was frequently attacked, including by Augustine of Hippo and Aeneas of Gaza.

== Modern ==
Scholars have debated the extent of Plato's belief in metempsychosis since at least the Renaissance. Marsilio Ficino argued that Plato's references to metempsychosis were intended to be allegorical. Modern scholars, including Chad Jorgensen and Gerard Naddaf, have tended to agree with Ficino.

"Metempsychosis" is the title of a longer work by the metaphysical poet John Donne, written in 1601. The poem, also known as the Infinitati Sacrum, consists of two parts, the "Epistle" and "The Progress of the Soule". In the first line of the latter part, Donne writes that he "sing[s] of the progresse of a deathlesse soule".

Metempsychosis is a recurring theme in James Joyce's modernist novel Ulysses (1922).

== See also ==
- Druze
- Gilgul
- Saṃsāra
- Yazidis
- Yaʽfuriyya Shia
- Zalmoxis
