= Revolts of Zayd ibn Ali =

740 failed rebellion in the Umayyad Caliphate

- Part of the Alid revolts
| Date | 6 January 740 CE (10 Safar 122 AH)–743 CE (125 AH) |
| Location | Kufa (modern day Iraq); Khorasan (modern day Afghanistan,Iran and Turkmenistan) |
| Result | Umayyad victory; Death of Zayd ibn Ali and suppression of revolt in Kufa; Death of Yahya ibn Zayd and suppression of new revolt |

Belligerents
| Umayyad Caliphate | Supporters of Zayd ibn Ali |

Commanders and leaders
| Hisham ibn Abd al-Malik; Al-Walid II; Yusuf ibn Umar al-Thaqafi; Hakam ibn Salt; Nasr ibn Sayyar; Salm ibn Ahwaz al-Mazini; Amr ibn Zurara † | Zayd ibn Ali †; Yahya ibn Zayd †; Mu'awiya ibn Ishaq †; Salma ibn Kohayk; Nasr ibn Khazima Abasi †; Supported by: Abu Hanifa (financial & religious support); Jafar as-Sadiq (spiritual support) |

Strength
| Total: ≈30,000 Against Zayd ibn Ali: ≈12,000; Against Yahya ibn Zayd: ≈18,000 | Total: ≈288-370 Zayd ibn Ali’s forces: ≈218-300; Yahya ibn Zayd’s forces: 70 |

Casualties and losses
| Total: ≈70+ Against Zayd ibn Ali: 70+; Against Yahya ibn Zayd: Minimum-Heavy | Total: Unknown Against Zayd ibn Ali: Heavy; Yahya ibn Zayd’s forces: Heavy |

The Revolts of Zayd ibn Ali (Arabic: ثورات زيد بن علي, romanized: al-Thawrāt Zayd ibn ʿAlī), also known as the Zaydi Revolts, were a series of revolts initially led by Zayd ibn Ali and later his son and successor Yahya ibn Zayd against the Umayyad Caliphate, which had taken over from the Rashidun Caliphate since the death of his great-grandfather, Ali.

== Revolt ==
Unlike his brother, Muhammad al-Baqir, the fifth Imam of the Twelver and Isma'ili Shi'as, Zayd ibn Ali believed the time was ripe for renewing the rebellion against the Umayyad Caliphs in support of the claims of his own Hashemite clan. On his trip to Iraq, he was persuaded by pro-Alid faction of Kufa that he had support of 10,000 warriors and could easily drive out a few hundred Umayyad soldiers stationed there. Kufa had previously been the capital of his great-grandfather Ali. He started to gather support from the populace in Kufa, Basra and Mosul and 15,000 people were enlisted on his army register. The Umayyad governor of Kufa, however, learned of the plot, and commanded the people to gather at the great mosque, locked them inside and began a search for Zayd. Zayd with some troops fought his way to the mosque and called on people to come out. However, in events reminiscent of Husayn ibn Ali's own abandonment by the Kufans decades earlier, most of Zayd's supporters deserted him and joined the Umayyads, leaving him with only a few dozen followers who were vastly outnumbered.

Nevertheless, Zayd continued to fight. His small band of followers was decisively defeated by the much larger Umayyad force, and Zayd was struck by an arrow that pierced his forehead. The removal of the arrow led to his death. He was secretly buried outside Kufa, but the Umayyads eventually discovered his grave. In retribution for the uprising, they exhumed Zayd's body and crucified it.

The corpse remained on the cross for three years. After the death of Caliph Hisham, his successor ordered Zayd's body to be burned, and the ashes were scattered in the Euphrates River. When the Abbasids—who, like Zayd, were Hashemites—overthrew the Umayyads in 750, they reportedly exhumed Hisham's body, crucified it, and burned it in revenge for Zayd.

== Consequences ==
Zayd's desperate rebellion became the inspiration for the Zaydi sect, a school of Shi'a Islam that holds that any learned descendant of Ali can become an Imam by asserting and fighting for his claim as Zayd did (the rest of the Shi'as believe, in contrast, that the Imam must be divinely appointed). However, all schools of Islam, including the majority Sunnis, regard Zayd as a righteous martyr (shahid) against what is regarded as the corrupt leadership of the Umayyads. It is even reported that Abu Hanifa, founder of the largest school of Sunni jurisprudence, gave financial support to Zayd's revolt and called on others to join Zayd's rebellion.

Zayd's son Yahya, who managed to escape the suppression of the revolt, tried to recruit followers in Khurasan, but in vain; once the Umayyads were alerted to his presence there, he was pursued and killed. Zayd's rebellion inspired other revolts by members of his clan, especially in the Hejaz, the most famous among these being the revolt of Muhammad al-Nafs al-Zakiyya against the Abbasids in 762. Zaydi agitation continued until 785 and re-erupted in Tabaristan under the leadership of the Zayd's son, Hasan ibn Zayd ibn Ali. His revolt attracted many supporters, among them the ruler of Rustamids, the son of Farīdūn (a descendant of Rostam Farrokhzād), Abd al-Rahman ibn Rustam.

It is narrated in the Shi'a book, Uyun al-Akhbar al-Ridha it says that it is narrated from Fudhayl ibn Yasar, one of Zayd ibn Ali's companions who fought alongside him that :

I went to see Zayd ibn Ali ibn Al-Hussein ibn Ali ibn Abi Talib (s) on the morning of the day on which he revolted in Kufa. I heard him say. ‘Which of you men will help me fight with the Anbats from Sham? I swear by Him who appointed Muhammad to the Prophethood and established him as one to give glad tidings and admonishments, that on the Resurrection Day I will grab the hands of whoever helps me in this battle and deliver him to Paradise with the permission of the Honorable the Exalted God.’I rented a horse when he got killed and set out for Medina. I went to see Imam As-Sadiq (s) there. I thought I should not tell him (s) about Zayd getting killed since the Imam (s) might get upset. When I saw the Imam (s), he said, “What did my uncle Zayd do?” I got so upset I could hardly talk. I said, “They killed him.” He (s) said, “Did they kill him?” I said, “Yes. By God, they killed him.” He (s) asked, “Did they hang his corpse on the gallows?” I said, “Yes. By God, they hung his corpse on the gallows.”The narrator added, “The Imam (s) started to cry and his tears were flowing down his face like pearls. Then the Imam (al-Sadiq) said, ‘O Fudhayl! Were you present there in the battle with the people of Syria along with my uncle?’ I said, ‘Yes.’ The Imam (s) asked, ‘How many people did you kill?’ I said, ‘Six of them.’ The Imam (s) said, ‘Did you have any doubts about shedding their blood?’ I said, ‘No, I would not have killed them if I had had any doubts.’ Then I heard the Imam (s) say, ‘O God! Please give me a share of the reward for this battle. I swear by God that my uncle and his companions were martyrs just like Ali ibn Abi Talib (s) and his companions.

== See also ==
- Zayd ibn Ali
- Hisham ibn Abd al-Malik
- Zaydism
- Husayn ibn Ali
- Alids
- Hashemites
- Shi'a
- Rafida
- Rustamids
- Farīdūn (the father of Abd ar-Rahman ibn Rustam, a descendant of Rostam Farrokhzād)
