= Zayd ibn Ali =

Alid political and religious leader (c. 695–740)

Zayd ibn Ali زَيْدُ اِبْنُ عَلِيٍّ Al-Shahīd Ḥalīf Al-Qurʾān

5th Zaydi Imam
- In office 714/715 CE – 739/740 CE
- Preceded by: Ali al-Sajjad (doctrinal); Hasan al-Muthana (historical)
- Succeeded by: Yahya ibn Zayd

Personal life
- Born: 698 CE (80 AH) Medina, Hejaz, Umayyad Caliphate
- Died: 740 CE (aged 42) (2nd Safar 122 AH) Kufa, Iraq, Umayyad Caliphate
- Children: Ḥasan; Yaḥyā; Ḥusayn; ʿĪsā; Muḥammad
- Parents: Ali al-Sajjad (father); Jayda al-Sindiyya (mother)
- Other name: Abū al-Ḥusayn (Kunya)

Religious life
- Religion: Islam

Zayd ibn ʿAlī (Arabic: زيد بن علي; 695–740), was the son of Ali al-Sajjad, and great-grandson of Ali ibn Abi Talib. He led an unsuccessful revolt against the Umayyad Caliphate, in which he died. The event gave rise to the Zaydiyya sect of Shia Islam, which holds him as the next Imam after his father Ali al-Sajjad. Zayd ibn Ali is also seen as a major religious figure by many Sunnis and was supported by the prominent Sunni jurist, Abu Hanifa, who issued a fatwa in support of Zayd against the Umayyads.

To Twelver and Isma'ili Shias however, his elder half-brother Muhammad al-Baqir is seen as the next Imam of the Shias. Nevertheless, he is considered an important revolutionary figure by Shias and a martyr (shahid) by all schools of Islam, including Sunnis and Shias. The call for revenge for his death, and for the brutal display of his body, contributed to the Abbasid revolution.

Zayd was a learned religious scholar. Various works are ascribed to him, including Musnad al-Imam Zayd (published by E. Grifinni as Corpus Iuris di Zaid b. ʿAlī, also known as Majmuʿ al-Fiqh), possibly the earliest known work of Islamic law. However, the attribution is disputed; these likely represent early Kufan legal tradition.

== Birth ==
Zayd was born in Medina in 695 CE. He was the son of Ali al-Sajjad. The 9th-century biographer Ibn Qutaybah wrote in his al-Ma'ārif that Zayd's mother was from Sindh; this statement is repeated by 'Abd al-Razzaq al-Hasani. Zayd's mother Jodha was known to Muslim chroniclers as Jayda al-Sindiyya.

== Contemporary opinions ==
Zayd is held in high regard in both Sunni and Shia sources. When the ascetic Umayyad Caliph Umar ibn Abd al-Aziz was the Governor of Medina during the reign of Al-Walid I and Sulayman, he was an associate of Zayd ibn Ali. Zayd continued to correspond and advise him when he became the Khalifah.

Zayd is believed the first narrator of Al-Sahifa al-Sajjadiyya of Zainul-'Abidin. Several works of hadith, theology, and Qur'anic exegesis are attributed to him. The first work of Islamic jurisprudence Mujmu'-al-Fiqh is attributed to him. The only surviving hand-written manuscript of this work dating back to at least a thousand years is preserved in the pope's library, Bibliotheca Vaticana in Vatican City under "Vaticani arabi". Photocopies of this work are available in several libraries including the Library of the University of Birmingham in the United Kingdom. In 2007, Sayed Nafees al-Hussaini obtained a copy of this work, and re-issued it from Lahore.

He was an excellent orator and spent much of his life learning and educating others. It is said that his half-brother, al-Baqir, wanted to test him on the Quranic knowledge, asking him various questions for which he received answers beyond his expectation, causing to him to remark, "For our father and mother's life! You are one of a kind. God grace your mother who gave you birth, she gave birth to a replica of your forefathers!" Al-Baqir also said: "No one of us was born to resemble 'Ali ibn Abi Talib more than he did."

When describing Zayd, his nephew, Ja'far al-Sadiq, said: "Among us he was the best read in the Holy Qur'an, and the most knowledgeable about religion, and the most caring towards family and relatives." Hence his title Ḥalīf Al-Qurʾān (Arabic: حَلِيْف ٱلْقُرْأٓن, romanized: Ally of the Qur'an). Jafar Sadiq's love for his uncle Zayd was immense. Upon receiving and reading the letter of Zayd ibn Ali's death he broke down and cried uncontrollably, and proclaimed aloud:

From God we are and to Him is our return. I ask God for my reward in this calamity. He was a really good uncle. My uncle was a man for our world and for our Hereafter. I swear by God that my uncle is a martyr just like the martyrs who fought along with God's Prophet (s) or Ali (s) or Al-Hassan (s) or Al-Hussein (s) Uyun Akhbar al-Reza – The Source of Traditions on Imam Ali ar-Ridha

Ali ar-Ridha said:

.. He (Zayd bin Ali) was one of the scholars from the Household of Muhammad and got angry for the sake of the Honorable the Exalted God. He fought with the enemies of God until he got killed in His path. My father Musa ibn Ja'far al-Kazim narrated that he had heard his father Ja'far ibn Muhammad say, "May God bless my uncle Zayd ... He consulted with me about his uprising and I told him, "O my uncle! Do this if you are pleased with being killed and your corpse being hung up from the gallows in Al-Kunasa neighborhood." After Zayd left, As-Sadiq said, "Woe be to those who hear his call but do not help him!"

— Ali ar-Ridha

In one hadith, the Sunni imam Abu Hanifa once said about Zayd, "I met with Zayd and I never saw in his generation a person more knowledgeable, as quick a thinker, or more eloquent than he was." However, in another hadith, Abu Hanifa said: "I have not seen anyone with more knowledge than Ja'far ibn Muhammad." Abu Hanifa was reportedly a student of Ja'far, like Malik ibn Anas, another well-known imam of Sunni Fiqh.

The Sufi scholar, Mujtahid and mystic, Sufyan al-Thawri, respected Zayd's knowledge and character, saying "Zayd took the place of Imam al-Husayn. He was the most versed human concerning Allah's holy book. I affirm: women have not given birth to the likes of Zayd ... "

Al-Shaykh Al-Mufid the writer of the famous Shi'ah book Kitab al Irshad described him as, " ... a devout worshipper, pious, a jurist, God-fearing and brave."

== Prophecy of martyrdom ==
Al-Baqir narrated:

The Holy Prophet put his sacred hand on Al-Husayn bin Ali's back and said: "O Husayn, it will not be long until a man will be born among your descendants. He will be called Zaid; he will be killed as a martyr. On the day of resurrection, he and his companions will enter heaven, setting their feet on the necks of the people."

Husayn narrated that his grandfather Muhammad prophesied his death:

The Holy Prophet put his sacred hand on my back and said: "O Husayn, it will not be long until a man will be born among your descendants. He will be called Zaid; he will be killed as a martyr. On the day of resurrection, he and his companions will enter heaven, setting their feet on the necks of the people."

— Al Husayn

== Death ==
In AH 122 (AD 740), Zayd led an uprising against the Umayyad rule of Hisham ibn Abd al-Malik in the city of Kufa. Initially Zayd had the support of the people of Kufa but then they asked him for his opinions on Umar and Abu Bakr, to which Zayd replied:

May God have mercy on both of them and forgive them both! I have not heard anyone in my family renouncing them both nor saying anything but good about them.

Following this statement, many of his Shia supporters abandoned him.

The Umayyad governor of Iraq, Yusuf ibn Umar al-Thaqafi, would manage to bribe key figures in Kufa which allowed him to break the insurgence, and kill Zayd in battle by a arrow to his forehead.

Following his death, Zayd's followers secretly buried him in a dry riverbed to prevent the desecration of his body. However, Umayyad forces discovered the grave, exhumed his corpse, and decapitated him. His severed head was sent to Caliph Hisham ibn Abd al-Malik in Damascus before being publicly displayed in Medina and Egypt, while his body was gibbeted in Kufa for several years. Upon Hisham's death, his successor ordered Zayd's remains taken down, burned, and scattered into the Euphrates to prevent his grave from being a place of pilgrimage.

== Shrines ==
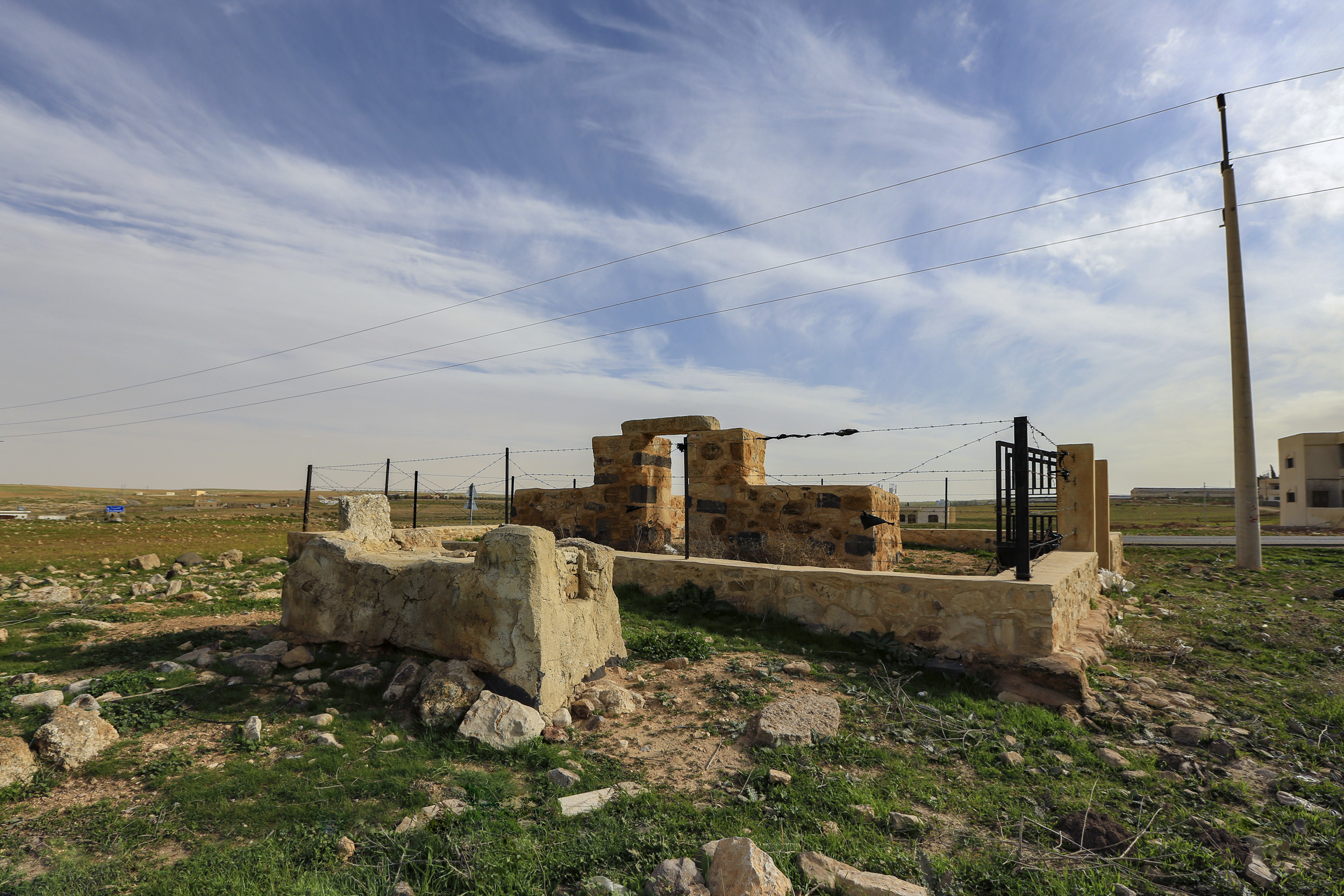
Shrine in Rabba, Jordan (31°16′7″N 35°44′36.67″E)

There are two shrines for Zayd, One is in Kafel, Iraq, the other is in Karak, Jordan. The shrine in Jordan is believed to be the final resting place of the head of Zayd ibn 'Ali ibn Al-Husayn.

According to later tradition, relayed by the 14th-century historian al-Maqrizi, Zayd's severed head was brought to Egypt, and displayed at the Mosque of Amr in Fustat, until it was stolen and buried. A mosque was erected over the site. When it fell into ruin by the early 12th century, the Fatimid vizier, al-Afdal Shahanshah, ordered it excavated, and the head was placed in a purpose-built shrine on 1 March 1131. This building, inaccurately known as the Shrine of Zayn al-Abidin (Zayd's father), was located some 2 kilometres (1.2 mi) north of the Mosque of Amr, and was entirely rebuilt twice in the 19th century. Nothing of it survives today.

== Legacy ==
All schools of Islam, Sunnis and Shias, regard Zayd as a righteous martyr against what was regarded as the corrupt leadership of an unjust king proclaimed to be a caliph. It is even reported that Abu Hanifa, a mujtahid and founder of the largest school of Sunni jurisprudence, gave financial support to Zayd's revolt, and called on others to join Zayd's rebellion. Zayd's rebellion inspired other revolts by members of his clan, especially in the Hejaz, the most famous among these being the revolt of Muhammad al-Nafs al-Zakiyya al-Mahdi against the Abbasids in 762.

Zaydis believe that he was a rightful Caliph, and their sect is named after him. It is believed that from them originated the word for Shi'ites, Rafida.

== Descendants ==
- Hasan, 1st son
- Yahya, 2nd son
- Al-Ḥusayn Dhu'l-Dam'a, 3rd son and the grandfather of Yahya's father Umar
- Īsā Mū'tam (Father of Aḥmad) al-Ashbāl, 4th son and the 13th Imām of Zaydiyyā
- Ahmad ibn Isa ibn Zayd, grandson
- Muḥammad, 5th son and the father of Muḥammad the 17th Imām of Zaydiyyā
- Yahya ibn Umar, the grandson of Zayd's grandson Yaḥyā, who lead an abortive uprising from Kufa in 250 A.H. (864-65 C.E.)

== See also ==
- Imamzadeh Ali ibn Jafar
- Revolt of Zayd ibn Ali
- Husayn ibn Ali
- Hashemites
- Zaidi (surname)
- Dukayniyya Shia
- Khalafiyya Shia
- Ahmad ibn Isa ibn Zayd

Early Islamic scholars

Muhammad, The final Messenger of God (570–632) the Constitution of Medina, taught the Quran, and advised his companions
Abdullah ibn Masud (died 653) taught	Ali (607–661) fourth caliph taught	Aisha, Muhammad's wife and Abu Bakr's daughter taught	Abd Allah ibn Abbas (618–687) taught	Zayd ibn Thabit (610–660) taught	Umar (579–644) second caliph taught	Abu Hurairah (603–681) taught
Alqama ibn Qays (died 681) taught	Husayn ibn Ali (626–680) taught	Qasim ibn Muhammad ibn Abi Bakr (657–725) taught and raised by Aisha	Urwah ibn Zubayr (died 713) taught by Aisha, he then taught	Said ibn al-Musayyib (637–715) taught	Abdullah ibn Umar (614–693) taught	Abd Allah ibn al-Zubayr (624–692) taught by Aisha, he then taught
Ibrahim al-Nakha’i taught	Ali ibn Husayn Zayn al-Abidin (659–712) taught	Hisham ibn Urwah (667–772) taught	Ibn Shihab al-Zuhri (died 741) taught	Salim ibn Abd-Allah ibn Umar taught	Umar ibn Abdul Aziz (682–720) raised and taught by Abdullah ibn Umar
Hammad ibn Abi Sulayman taught	Muhammad al-Baqir (676–733) taught	Farwah bint al-Qasim Jafar's mother
Abu Hanifa (699–767) wrote Al Fiqh Al Akbar and Kitab Al-Athar, jurisprudence followed by Sunni, Sunni Sufi, Barelvi, Deobandi, Zaidiyyah and originally by the Fatimid and taught	Zayd ibn Ali (695–740)	Ja'far bin Muhammad Al-Baqir (702–765) Muhammad and Ali's great great grand son, jurisprudence followed by Shia, he taught	Malik ibn Anas (711–795) wrote Muwatta, jurisprudence from early Medina period now mostly followed by Maliki Sunnis in North Africa, and taught	Al-Waqidi (748–822) wrote history books like Kitab al-Tarikh wa al-Maghazi, student of Malik ibn Anas	Abu Muhammad Abdullah ibn Abdul Hakam (died 829) wrote biographies and history books, student of Malik ibn Anas
Abu Yusuf (729–798) wrote Usul al-fiqh	Muhammad al-Shaybani (749–805)	al-Shafi‘i (767–820) wrote Al-Risala, jurisprudence followed by Shafi'i Sunnis and Sufis, and taught	Ismail ibn Ibrahim	Ali ibn al-Madini (778–849) wrote The Book of Knowledge of the Companions	Ibn Hisham (died 833) wrote early history and As-Sirah an-Nabawiyyah, Muhammad's biography
Isma'il ibn Ja'far (719–775)	Musa al-Kadhim (745–799)	Ahmad ibn Hanbal (780–855) wrote Musnad Ahmad ibn Hanbal jurisprudence followed by Hanbali Sunnis and Sufis	Muhammad al-Bukhari (810–870) wrote Sahih al-Bukhari hadith books	Muslim ibn al-Hajjaj (815–875) wrote Sahih Muslim hadith books	Dawud al-Zahiri (815–883/4) founded the Zahiri school	Muhammad ibn Isa at-Tirmidhi (824–892) wrote Jami` at-Tirmidhi hadith books	Al-Baladhuri (died 892) wrote early history Futuh al-Buldan, Genealogies of the Nobles
Ibn Majah (824–887) wrote Sunan ibn Majah hadith book	Abu Dawood (817–889) wrote Sunan Abu Dawood Hadith Book
Muhammad ibn Ya'qub al-Kulayni (864- 941) wrote Kitab al-Kafi hadith book followed by Twelver Shia	Muhammad ibn Jarir al-Tabari (838–923) wrote History of the Prophets and Kings, Tafsir al-Tabari	Abu al-Hasan al-Ash'ari (874–936) wrote Maqālāt al-islāmīyīn, Kitāb al-luma, Kitāb al-ibāna 'an usūl al-diyāna
Ibn Babawayh (923–991) wrote Man La Yahduruhu al-Faqih jurisprudence followed by Twelver Shia	Sharif Razi (930–977) wrote Nahj al-Balagha followed by Twelver Shia	Nasir al-Din al-Tusi (1201–1274) wrote jurisprudence books followed by Ismaili and Twelver Shia	Al-Ghazali (1058–1111) wrote The Niche for Lights, The Incoherence of the Philosophers, The Alchemy of Happiness on Sufism	Rumi (1207–1273) wrote Masnavi, Diwan-e Shams-e Tabrizi on Sufism
Key: Some of Muhammad's Companions	Key: Taught in Medina	Key: Taught in Iraq	Key: Worked in Syria	Key: Travelled extensively collecting the sayings of Muhammad and compiled books of hadith	Key: Worked in Persia
