= Bada' =

Shia Islamic concept

In Twelver Shi'ism, bada’ (Arabic: البَدَاء, lit. 'appearance' or 'emergence') means change in a divine decree in response to new circumstances. A textbook example of bada' in Twelver sources is the death of Isma'il, the eldest son of the Shia imam Ja'far al-Sadiq (d. 765). Isma'il was probably the expected or even the designated successor but he predeceased his father, who is said to have used the occasion to teach his followers about bada’.

Rather than an arbitrary change, bada’ refers to advancement or postponement in an act of creation without altering the overall divine design. More specifically, bada' often occurs when a divine decree on some matter is suspended until the autonomous decision of the creation occurs. For instance, believing in repentance (tawba) and praying for a better destiny are said to be impossible without believing in bada’. As another example, the reappearance of Muhammad al-Mahdi, the eschatological figure in Twelver Shi'ism, is said to have been postponed multiple times because of human acts.

Not all divine decrees are subject to change, however, as some are thought to be definitely ordained, such as the eventual reappearance of al-Mahdi (but not its exact time). It is similarly said that some apocalyptic signs of his reappearance are inevitable but the rest may be canceled.

== History ==
Belief in bada' might have first appeared among the Kaysanites, a now-extinct Shia sect, who followed Ali ibn Abi Talib (d. 661), the first Shia imam, and some of his descendants, particularly his son, Muhammad ibn al-Hanafiyya (d. 700). Mukhtar al-Thaqafi (d. 687), who revolted in support of Ibn al-Hanafiyya, reportedly attributed his defeat in 686–687 to a change in his destiny.

Bada' later emerged among Imami Shias, the predecessors of Twelvers. The theological details of it were developed especially by the Shia imam Muhammad al-Baqir (d. 732). Initially, bada’ might have referred to changes in divine decrees in response to human acts, such as prolonging one's life through certain prayers. It was later extended (to its current scope) probably in the wake of the succession crisis that ensued al-Sadiq's death.

Bada’ was later studied by the likes of Ibn Babawayh (d. 991), al-Shaykh al-Mufid (d. 1022), and al-Shaykh al-Tusi (d. 1067), all of whom were prominent Twelver scholars. Then bada’ gradually lost its significance in Twelver thought, until the Safavid era, when the topic was treated by the likes of Mir Damad (d. 1630) and Mulla Sadra (d. 1641), two leading Twelver theologians of that period.

== Quran and Islamic tradition ==
Quranic evidence cited in support of bada' includes the sparing of Isma'il from being sacrificed in verses 37:101–107, sparing of Jonah’s people from divine wrath in verse 10:98, and prolonging of Moses’ period of worship from thirty to forty nights in verses 7:138–142.

Another instance is verse 6:2, “He fixed a (life’s) term and a term is stated in His keeping,” which supports bada'. Similar is verse 13:39, “God blots out and establishes whatsoever He will, and with Him is the essence of the Book (Umm al-kitab), which implies that divine decrees might change in response to prayers. In particular, imams are said to have been annually informed on the night of al-Qadr about definitive events of the year ahead. Verse 13:39 also suggests that those divine decisions recorded in Umm al-kitab are not subject to change. Among the evidence is also verse 5:62, “The Jews say: The hand of God is fettered,” which Shia imams interpreted as Jews’ rejection of divine abrogation, particularly bada'. That is, Jews held that God had finished with creation and could not bring forth a new religion, said the imams.

There are also several Quranic verses, such as 8:39, 14:10–11, 50:29, 7:152–153, in which men are promised mercy should they repent. There are also numerous Islamic traditions to the effect that certain acts would lengthen or shorten one's life or change one's destiny. All these are cited by Twelver scholars in favor of bada’.

Some traditions, attributed to Shia imams, are intended to establish the theological necessity of bada’ by linking it to God’s justice and goodness. Such traditions recognize that bada' is necessary to avoid predestination. The latter contradicts God’s justice, it is said, for how could a just God force one to sin and then punish him? Some other Shia traditions emphasize the importance of believing in bada’. For instance, a tradition attributed to al-Sadiq describes belief in bada’ as a form of worship, adding that one cannot believe in repentance or prayer without believing in bada’.

== Views ==
Jews are said to have been the first to reject divine abrogation and, in particular, bada’, for they rejected the new religion, that is, Islam. Because of its ostensible contradiction with God’s omniscience, the Twelver doctrine of bada’ is also rejected by most other Islamic sects, including Sunnism and Zaydi Shi'ism. That is, bada’ is thought to contradict the belief that God has always had eternal foreknowledge of all events. More specifically, bada' apparently implies that God’s will develops over time and so does His knowledge, an idea which most Muslims reject.

An early counter-argument, attributed to the Shia scholar Hisham ibn al-Hakam (d. 795–796), contends that bada’ does not contradict God’s omniscience because God cannot know something that does not yet exist. Another argument in favor of bada’ is that God has had eternal knowledge of all such changes and cancellations. That is, instances of bada' might be unexpected for men, but not for God. More specifically, that God may change His decisions should be interpreted in the same way that He gets angry or pleased or astonished. In reality, a divine decree or prophecy may be postponed if any of its causes are not realized.

Yet another argument for bada’ is that God acts in the best interest of His creation. He must therefore adjust His decisions in response to changes in their circumstances. This argument is partly borrowed from Mu'tazilism, another Islamic sect. Finally, it is argued that the concept of bada' is necessary to avoid predestination, for how could there be any free will if all divine decrees are immutable? In particular, repentance or praying for a better destiny would not make any sense without bada'.

=== Connection to naskh ===
Bada’ is closely connected to naskh (lit. 'abrogation'), a Quranic notion widely accepted by all Muslims. More specifically, naskh is said to correspond to legislative abrogation (or cancellation of divine laws), while bada’ refers to theological abrogation (in matters of creation). Twelver scholars thus argued that Sunnis too believed in bada' but without using the name, for anyone who believes in abrogation of divine laws and postponement or advancement of divine will in the best interest of the creation necessarily believes in bada', they said.

== Sources ==
- Amir-Moezzi, M. A. (2015). "Badā'". In Fleet, K.; Krämer, G.; Matringe, D.; Nawas, J.; Stewart, D. J. (eds.). Encyclopaedia of Islam (Three ed.). doi:10.1163/1573-3912_ei3_COM_25083. ISSN 1573-3912.
- Goldziher, I.; Tritton, A. S. (2012). "Badāʾ". In Bearman, P. J.; Bianquis, Th.; Bosworth, C. E.; van Donzel, E.; Heinrichs, W. P. (eds.). Encyclopaedia of Islam (Second ed.). doi:10.1163/1573-3912_islam_SIM_0987. ISSN 1573-3912.
- Haider, N. (2014). Shi'i Islam: An Introduction. Cambridge University Press. ISBN 9781107031432.
- Lalani, A. R. (2000). Early Shī'ī Thought: The Teachings of Imam Muḥammad al-Bāqir. I.B. Tauris. ISBN 1850435928.
- Madelung, W. (1988). "Badāʾ". Encyclopaedia Iranica. Vol. III/4. pp. 354–355. ISSN 2330-4804.
- Madelung, W. (2014). "Early Imāmī Theology as Reflected in the Kitāb al-kāfi of al-Kulaynī". In Daftary, F.; Miskinzoda, G. (eds.). The Study of Shi'i Islam: History, Theology, and Law. I.B.Tauris. pp. 465–474. ISBN 9781780765068.
- Momen, M. (1985). An Introduction to Shi'i Islam. Yale University Press. ISBN 9780300035315.
- Sachedina, A. A. (1981). Islamic Messianism: The Idea of Mahdī in Twelver Shī'ism. State University of New York Press. ISBN 9780873954426.
