= Sedrata =

Sedrata may refer to:

- Sedrata, Souk Ahras city in the Souk Ahras Province, Algeria
- Sedrata, Ouargla former city and Ibadi settlement in Algeria
