= Azzabas =

School of Islamic law in Ibadism

The Azzabas was one of the schools of Islamic law in Ibadism. The Ibadi school was founded between the years 1286 and 1386 and is mainly centered in the Maghreb region. In practice, Azzabas promotes a system of collectivism rather than individualism. Decisions earmarked by the Azzabas were conducted within a council, whose members attained their positions via consultations, and its rulings derived from a varied number of sources.

== See also ==
- Ibadism in the Maghreb
