= Ibadism =

Third-largest branch of Islam

- الإباضية al-ʾIbāḍiyya
- Sultan Qaboos Grand Mosque in Muscat, Oman, is widely regarded as the most important monument associated with Ibadism.
- Type: School of Islam
- Classification: Muhakkima
- Theology: Monotheism
- Territory: Oman; Algeria (Mzab); Libya (Nafusa); Tunisia (Djerba); Tanzania (Zanzibar)
- Founder: Jabir ibn Zayd
- Origin: c. AD 692; Basra
- Members: c. 3,000,000

Ibadism or Ibadhism (Arabic: الإباضية, romanized: al-ʾIbāḍiyya, Arabic pronunciation: [alʔibaːˈdˤijja]) is a distinct school of Islam and is commonly regarded as the third Islamic branch, alongside Sunni Islam and Shia Islam. Its roots go back to the Kharijite secession from Ali, the prophet Muhammad's cousin and son in law who was the first Shia Imam and the fourth Sunni Rashidun caliph. However, contemporary Ibadis generally reject the characterization of their faith as Kharijites. Ibadism emerged during the early centuries of Islam and developed from the political and theological disputes surrounding the First Fitna. The tradition is historically associated with the early Muhakkima movement.

Ibadism is associated with Abdallah ibn Ibad, after whom the movement is named, while Jabir ibn Zayd is regarded as one of its most important early Ibadi scholars. The Ibadi movement developed in Basra before spreading to Oman, North Africa, and East Africa. Ibadism has its own distinctive theological and legal traditions, particularly concerning religious leadership, the nature of the Muslim community, and the qualifications required of an Imam. The followers of the Ibadi tradition are known as the Ibadis or, as they call themselves, "The People of Truth and Integrity." Ibadis are significantly less numerous than the two main Islamic denominations, Sunnis and Shias, which together account for nearly 100 percent of the global Muslim population. Ibadism remains understudied by outsiders, including both non-Muslims and Sunni and Shia Muslims.

== History ==
=== Background ===
The Ibadis originated as a moderate branch of the Kharijites, an Islamic sect that originally split from the early dissenters known as the Muhakkima. These groups initially supported Ali during the First Fitna but withdrew their allegiance after rejecting the arbitration at the Battle of Siffin in 657 AD. From the Ibadi perspective, this original movement represented the only faction striving to restore the just Islamic Imamate as it existed during the time of Abu Bakr, Umar, the first six years of Uthman's rule, and the early years of Ali's reign before the arbitration.

The military efforts of the early seceders ended with their defeat by Ali ibn Abi Talib at the Battle of Nahrawan in 658 AD. This was followed by another massacre at Al-Nukhaylah at the hands of the joint forces of Mu'awiya I and Hasan ibn Ali. After these events, Umayyad rule became firmly established and focused on suppressing all opposition. Consequently, sympathizers of the movement were forced to hide their faith and conduct their activities in secret. Early Ibadi literature often refers to this underground community as al-Muslimun or Jama'at al-Muslimin.

Among the survivors of the Battle of Nahrawan were Urwa ibn Udayya and his brother Abu Bilal Mirdas. They continued their religious activities in Basra, where they were known for their devotion and became leading members of the 'Jama'at al-Muslimin'. Abu Bilal was particularly influential in Basra and was one of three men who openly commented on the first sermon of Ziyad ibn Abihi when Ziyad was appointed governor of Basra, Khurasan, and Sijistan by Mu'awiya.

Records indicate that Abu Bilal maintained close ties with Jabir ibn Zayd and spent significant time with him. Together they visited Aisha bint Abi Bakr and questioned her regarding her role in the Battle of the Camel. During this period, Jabir established his leadership over the group. As a learned man from the Azd tribe, he focused on intellectual activities to preserve Islamic teachings without arousing the suspicion of the Umayyad authorities. His position as a prominent mufti in Basra provided him with cover and enabled him to form connections with influential individuals across the Islamic world.

=== Kharijite split ===
The Ibadi school of Kharijites emerged after the siege of Mecca in 683 AD, during the Second Fitna. Abd Allah ibn Ibad was part of a group of Basran Kharijites, led by Nafi ibn al-Azraq, who initially supported the defenders of Mecca against the Umayyads. However, they became disillusioned when the Meccan Caliph, Abd Allah ibn al-Zubayr, refused to denounce the late Caliph Uthman. Disappointed, they returned to Basra, where they were imprisoned by the Umayyad governor Ubayd Allah ibn Ziyad.

Following the Basran overthrow of Umayyad rule in support of Ibn al-Zubayr in late AD 683 or early 684, the imprisoned Kharijites were set free. After their release, Ibn al-Azraq led many Kharijites to Ahvaz in Khuzestan, condemning the Basrans for supporting Ibn al-Zubayr and labeling them "polytheists." However, Ibn Ibad stayed behind in Basra and defended those who remained. He argued that the Basrans were not polytheists but guilty only of "ingratitude" (kufr ni'ma), a lesser offense that allowed true Muslims to live among them. Ibn Ibad also opposed other Kharijite factions. He rejected the views of Abd Allah ibn al-Saffar, founder of the Sufri sect, and clashed with Abu Bayhas, leader of the Bayhasiyya sect, whose views were closer to the radical doctrines of Ibn al-Azraq.

The Ibadis distanced themselves from more extreme Kharijite beliefs, particularly on two key issues:

1. Khuruj (Revolt): Nafi ibn al-Azraq argued that hijrah (emigration) or khuruj (armed revolt) was mandatory and declared that Muslim opponents lived in "lands of war" (dar al-harb). He also labeled those who did not participate in revolt (al-qa'adah) as idolaters. In contrast, the Ibadis, following the early Muhakkima doctrine, believed their Muslim opponents were "infidels-in-gratitude" (kuffar), not polytheists, and that hijrah was not obligatory. They allowed Muslims to live among their opponents and accepted that those who did not fight could still be considered supporters of the cause, with their inaction forgiven.
2. Attitude Toward Muslim Opponents: The Azraqites took a harsh stance, viewing their Muslim opponents as idolaters, while also viewing it permissible to kill women and children, take captives, and seize property. They even forbade marrying their women or inheriting from them. In contrast, the Ibadis condemned these practices as violations of Islamic principles. Both Jabir ibn Zayd and Abd Allāh ibn Ibāḍ rejected these extremist views and opposed other radical Kharijite groups, such as the Sufriyya and Najdat, despite some differences between these groups and the Azraqites.

The Ibadis viewed the doctrines of Nafi and other extreme Kharijites as dangerous heresies (bid'ah) and waged wars against them. Early Ibadi writings, like the Sirah of Salim ibn Dhakwan, reflect their opposition to extremism. In Basra, a moderate Kharijite doctrine emerged under Jabir ibn Zayd, influenced by the teachings of Ibn Abbas. Missionaries spread this doctrine across the Caliphate, including to Oman, Yemen, Hadramawt, Khurasan, and North Africa. Despite their efforts, the Ibadi leaders in Basra practiced kitman (concealment of beliefs) to avoid persecution after the Umayyads retook control of the city under Abd al-Malik ibn Marwan in 691 AD.

=== Omani Imamate ===
Jābir ibn Zayd was eventually recognised as the first Imam of the Ibadis although this was in a state of kitman. Ibn Zayd's criticisms of the narrations of Muhammad's companions formed the corpus of the Ibadi interpretation of Islamic law. The position of Ibadi Imam was elected, unlike the dynastic succession of the Sunnis and Shi'as, and was not exclusive, with individual communities encouraged to elect their Imam. These imams exercised political, spiritual and military functions. In 745, Talib al-Haqq established the first Ibadi state in the Hadhramaut and succeeded in capturing Yemen in 746 from the Umayyad Caliphate. The Ibadi insurrection then spread to the Hejaz, with Abu Hamza al-Mukhtar conquering Mecca and Medina. In response, the Caliph Marwan II led a 4,000-strong army and routed the Ibadis first in Mecca, then in Sanaa in Yemen, and finally surrounded them in Shibam in the western Hadhramaut in 748, defeating and killing Abu Hamza and Ibn Yahya and destroying the first Ibadi state. Problems back in their heartland of Syria led the Umayyads to sign a peace accord with the Ibadis, who were allowed to retain a community in Shibam. A second Ibadi state was established in Oman in 750, but fell to the newly formed Abbasid Caliphate in 752. Another Ibadi state was established in Oman in 793, surviving for a century until the Abbasid recapture in 893. However, Abbasid influence after reconquest was nominal and Ibadi imams continued to wield considerable power. Ibadi imamates were re-established in subsequent centuries. Ibadis still form the majority of the contemporary Omani population and the royal family of Oman are Ibadi.

=== Further expansion ===
Main Ibadi settlements in the Maghreb region (North Africa)

Ibadi missionary activity was met with considerable success in North Africa. In 757, Ibadis seized Tripoli and captured Kairouan the next year. Driven out by the Abbasid army in 761, Ibadi leaders founded a state, which became known as Rustamid dynasty, in Tahart. It was overthrown in 909 by the Fatimid Caliphate. Immediately following this period, the Ibadi faith had a continuing presence in the Sahara, as they fled the end of the Rustamid dynasty and founded the regional trading city, Sedrata, along the Trans-Saharan trade routes. Ibadi communities continue to exist in the Nafusa Mountains in northwestern Libya, the island of Djerba in Tunisia, and in the M'zab in Algeria. In East Africa, they are found in Zanzibar. Ibadi missionary activity also reached Persia, India, Egypt, Sudan, Spain and Sicily, although Ibadis communities in these regions ceased to exist.

By the year 900, Ibadism had spread to Sindh, Khorasan, the Hadhramaut, Dhofar, the Imamate of Oman, Muscat, the Nafusa Mountains, and Qeshm, Hormozgan; by 1200, the sect was present in al-Andalus, Sicily, M'zab and the western part of the Sahel as well. In the 14th century, historian Ibn Khaldun made reference to vestiges of Ibadi influence in Hadhramaut, though the sect no longer exists in the region today.

== Views ==
Ibadis state that their school predates mainstream Islamic schools and some western non-Muslim writers agree. In particular, Donald Hawley's view was that Ibadism should be considered an early and highly orthodox interpretation of Islam.

=== Ibadi imamate and political theory ===
Unlike the Sunni theory of the caliphate of the Rashidun, and the Shi'i notion of divinely appointed Imamate, the leaders of Ibadi Islam—called Imams—do not need to rule the entire Muslim world; Muslim communities are considered capable of ruling themselves. The Ibadis reject the belief that the leader of the Muslim community must be descended from the Quraysh tribe. (This differs from the Sunni belief and also the Shia belief which holds that ideally and eventually Muslims will be ruled by the Mahdi, who will be descended from Muhammad's household – Ahl al-Bayt – Muhammad having been a member of the Quraysh tribe.) Rather, the two primary qualifications of an Ibadi imam are that he be the most pious man of the community and the most learned in fiqh, or Islamic jurisprudence; and that he have the military knowledge to defend the Ibadi community against war and oppression. In the Omani tradition, an imam who is learned in the Islamic legal sciences is considered "strong" (qawī), and an imam whose primary skills are military without scholarly qualifications is considered "weak" (ḍaʻīf). Unlike a strong imam, a weak imam is obliged to consult the ulamāʾ, or community of scholars, before passing any judgement. A weak imam is appointed only at times of dire necessity, when the community is threatened with destruction.

Contemporary Ibadis uphold four "states of the religion" (masālik ad-dīn), which are four different types of imams each appropriate to certain contexts. The imām al-kitmān "Imam of secrecy" is a learned scholar who "rules" in political quietism, practicing taqiyya to avoid persecution, in times when the Ibadi community cannot reveal itself openly. In some cases, a state of kitmān may be necessary even when there is no imam available. In this case, the Ibadi ulamāʾ takes over as surrogate rulers in place of the imam. This has been the case for most of the history of the North African Ibadis since the fall of the Rustumid imamate in 909, unlike their Omani coreligionists, who periodically reestablished imamates until 1958.

The second state, that of the imām al-shārī "Imam of exchange", are Ibadi imams who "exchange" their lives in the living world for a favorable place in the afterlife by engaging in military struggle (jihād) against an unbearable tyrannical authority with the goal of creating an Ibadi state. An example is the early Basran Kharijite leader Abu Bilal Mirdas, who was later held by the Ibadiyya to be a prototype of the "Imam of exchange". A would-be imām al-shārī cannot begin military action until they have found at least forty followers, as Abu Bilal had, willing to die for the cause; once the war has begun, the imam must continue to fight until there are only three followers remaining. A particularly ascetic lifestyle is required of the imām al-shārī and his followers, as suggested in the following speech by Abu Bilal:

You go out to fight in the way of God desiring His pleasure, not wanting anything of the goods of the present world, nor have you any desire for it, nor will you return to it. You are the ascetic and the hater of this life, desirous of the world to come, trying with all in your power to obtain it: going out to be killed and for nothing else. So know that you are [already] killed and have no return to this life; you are going forward and will not turn away from righteousness till you come to God. If such is your concern, go back and finish up your needs and wishes for this life, pay your debts, purchase yourself, take leave of your family and tell them that you will never return to them.

The third state, that of the imām al-zuhūr "Imam of glory", are imams as active rulers of an Ibadi state. The first two caliphs Abu Bakr and Umar are considered ideal models of the imām al-zuhūr. A ruling imam who sins must be removed from power; the Ibadi model for this is the assassination of the third caliph Uthman and the Kharijite revolt against Ali, both actions being viewed as legitimate resistance to a sinful ruler.

Finally, the state of the imām al-difā' "imam of defense" involves appointing an imam for a predetermined period of time when the Ibadi community is under foreign attack. He is removed once the threat has been defeated.

=== Views on other denominations ===
Ibadis believe that all who profess the belief in oneness of God and belief in the prophethood of Muhammad as the last messenger are members of the Islamic community. It is the duty of Ibadis to correct those who differ with them in their beliefs. Only the righteous Ibadis, referred to as the ahl al-istiqāmah "people of uprightness", are worthy of being called "Muslims". Non-Ibadi Muslims are termed the ahl al-khilaf "people of opposition". Nonetheless, non-Ibadi Muslims are still respected as fellow members of the ummah, who possess the various privileges accorded to Muslims in Islamic law and who Ibadis may intermarry with. All non-Ibadi Muslims and even Ibadi sinners are considered guilty of kufr (usually translated as "unbelief"), although contemporary Ibadis distinguish between kufr shirk, or religious disbelief, and kufr nifaq, or infidelity in the form of sinning. The term shirk—"polytheism" in conventional Islamic theology—has a wider use in Ibadi doctrine, where it is used to describe all forms of religious error beyond polytheism alone.

Classical Ibadi theologians have stated that only the ahl al-istiqāmah will go to paradise, and that all sinning Ibadis as well as all non-Ibadis will be in hell forever. Ibadis traditionally reject Sunni beliefs that all Muslims in hell will eventually enter paradise, and hold that hell is eternal and inescapable for all humans who were not righteous Ibadis in life.

About the Shia, Abu Hamza al-Mukhtar said, "As for these factions (of 'Ali), they are a faction which has repudiated the Book of God to promulgate lies about Him. They have not left the people (of the community) because of their insight into religion (as we have), or their deep knowledge of the Qur'an; they punish crime in those who commit it, and commit it themselves when they get the chance. They have determined upon tumult and know not the way out of it. Crude in (their knowledge of) the Qur'an, following soothsayers; teaching people to hope for the resurrection of the dead, and expecting the return (of their Imams) to this world; entrusting their religion to a man who can not see them! God smite them! How perverse they are!"

The notions of walayah ("affiliation") and bara'a ("disassociation") are central to the theology of Ibadi relations with non-Ibadi people. Only righteous Ibadis are considered worthy of friendship and association, whereas sinners and non-Ibadi Muslims are subject to dissociation, sometimes to the point of ostracism. Modern Ibadi scholars suggest that the duty of dissociation does not require rudeness or social avoidance, and that an Ibadi may have genuine affection for a non-Ibadi; nonetheless, "an inner awareness of separation" between upright Ibadis and non-Ibadis must be maintained. In practice, however, Ibadi Muslims have generally been very tolerant of non-Ibadi religious practice. During the period of imām al-kitmān, the duties of affiliation and disassociation are no longer valid.

Some have characterised the works of some Ibadi scholars as being particularly anti-Shi'ite in nature, and some state that Ibadi scholars, like al-Warjalani, held Nasibi views.

Ibadi beliefs remain understudied by outsiders, both non-Muslim and other Muslim. Ibadis have stated that whilst they read the works of both Sunnis and Shias, the learned scholars of those two sects never read Ibadi works and often repeat myths and false information when they address the topic of Ibadism without performing proper research.

=== Theological viewpoints ===
The development of Ibadi theology happened thanks to the works of scholars and imams of the community, whose histories, lives, and personalities are part of the Islamic history. Ibāḍī theology can be understood on the basis of the works of Ibn Ibāḍ, Jābir bin Zayd, Abū ‘Ubaida, Rabī‘ b. Ḥabīb and Abū Sufyān among others. Basra is the foundation of the Ibāḍī community. Various Ibāḍī communities were established in southern Arabia, with bases in Oman, North Africa, and East Africa.

In terms of scholastic theology, the Ibadi creed resembles that of the Muʿtazila in many aspects, except in the central question of predestination. Like the Muʿtazila and unlike the modern Sunni, the Ibadis believe that:

- Human knowledge of God is innate through the use of reason, rather than being learned. Therefore, a Quranic verse that appears to contradict with human reason must be metaphorically reinterpreted in the light of reason rather than being taken as fact. It is forbidden to decide matters of religious belief by taqlid, or deference to a clerical or otherwise human authority. This view is generally held among Sunni and Shia Muslims, too. While taqlid is allowed in Shia as means to learn religious practices, it is not allowed to decided matters of belief.
- The attributes of God are not distinct from his essence. Mercy, power, wisdom, and other divine attributes are merely different ways to describe the single unitary essence of God, rather than independent attributes and qualities that God possesses.
- Some Ibadis believe that the Quran was created by God at a certain point in time. While these Ibadis uphold the fact that "essential speech" is a way to describe his essence, they do not believe that the Quran is identical to this essence. To them, the Quran is simply a created indicator of his essence. This is in contrast to the Sunnis who believe that the Quran has always existed (it is uncreated). However historically earlier Ibadis believed that neither is the Qur'an created nor uncreated, and amongst contemporary Omani Ibadis some hold the Sunni position.
- Like Sunni and Shia Muslims, they interpret anthropomorphic references to God in the Quran symbolically rather than literally. Therefore, God does not actually have hands, a face, a throne, or other physical attributes, as he cannot be perceived by human senses and is not physical. They thus believe that Muslims will not see God on the Day of Resurrection, a belief shared with the Shi'a but not the Sunni. Similarly, Ibadis hold that the Scale on which God judges human deeds is metaphoric, as actions cannot be weighed.

But unlike the Mu'tazila, Ibadis follow the Ash'ari position of occasionalism, which holds that all events are caused directly by God and that what appear to be laws of causation, such as that a fire produces smoke, is only because God chooses to create fire, and then to create smoke. One Ibadi scholar has even stated that this single difference means that the Muʿtazila are more misguided than the Sunni.

=== Ibadi jurisprudence ===
The fiqh or jurisprudence of Ibadis is based on the same fundamental principles as Sunni and Shi'a juristic traditions, but the Ibadis reject taqlid or deference and stress the importance of ijtihad, or independent reasoning. Contemporary Ibadis hold that believers are allowed to follow incorrect opinions derived through ijtihad as long as they believe it to be true after having made an effort to arrive at the correct opinion; certain now-extinct Ibadi sects once held that those with incorrect opinions were disbelievers. Many early Ibadis rejected qiyas or deductive analogical reasoning as a basis for jurisprudence, but the importance of analogies is now widely accepted by Ibadi jurists.

Ibadis believe that the stage of the imām al-kitmān corresponds to Muhammad's life in Mecca before the Hijrah, when no independent Muslim community existed that could enforce Islamic laws. Therefore, ḥudūd punishments are suspended under an imām al-kitmān, except the punishments for apostasy, blasphemy, and murder. Ibadis also do not hold Friday prayers in the absence of a legitimate ruling imam.

Like the Shi'a but not the Sunni, they do not allow a couple who has committed zināʾ (unlawful sex) to marry each other.

During the Ramadan fast, Ibadis require ghusl or full-body ablution to be undertaken prior to the beginning of the fast on that day if it is necessitated, otherwise the fast for that day is invalid. They hold that committing grave sins is a form of breaking the fast. When making up for missed days of fasting after Ramadan has ended, the Ibadis believe that the atonement fast must be consecutive, whereas both Sunnis and Shi'as believe that Muslims may atone for missed days by fasting for the required amount at any time, whether consecutive or nonconsecutive.

Like the Shi'a and some Maliki Sunnis, the Ibadis keep their arms at their sides rather than clasping the hands during prayer. During the noon and afternoon prayers, Ibadis recite solely al-Fātiḥah, the first chapter of the Quran, whereas other Muslims may recite other Quranic verses in addition. They also do not say ʾāmīn after the recitation of al-Fātiḥah. Ibadis shorten prayers when staying in foreign territory—even if they do so on a permanent basis—unless they choose to adopt the country as their new homeland; Sunnis generally hold that believers should return to the full prayer after a given number of days outside of home.

=== Ibadi hadith ===
The primary Ibadi collection of hadiths, or traditions and sayings attributed to Muhammad, is the twelfth-century Tartīb al-Musnad, comprising 1,005 hadiths. The Tartīb is divided into four books. The first two books are muttaṣil narrations by Jabir ibn Zayd, a student of Muhammad's widow Aisha. The third book includes hadith transmitted by the eighth-century Kharijite scholar al-Rabi' bin Habib Al-Farahidi as preserved in the Jami Sahih collection, generally also from Jabir ibn Zayd. The fourth book consists of an appendix of saying and stories from later Ibadi scholars and imams.

Most of the Ibadi hadiths have a very short isnād or chain of transmission. They are claimed to be narrated from Jabir ibn Zayd to his student Abu Ubayda Muslim ibn Abi Karima and from the latter to al-Rabi', who died in 786 after preserving his transmissions in the Jami Sahih. This was then reformulated into the Tartīb al-Musnad some four centuries later. John C. Wilkinson, an expert on Ibadism, states that this chain of transmission "does not stand up to any close examination". However, Ibadis counter this by arguing that the four century gap is because they practiced Taqiyya. Most Ibadi hadiths are found in the standard Sunni collections, bar a small group with Kharijite biases, and contemporary Ibadis often approve of the standard Sunni collections.

Unlike in Sunni and Shi'a Islam alike, the study of hadiths has not traditionally been very important in Ibadi Islam, especially in Oman where Sunni influence was weaker.

=== Mysticism and Sufism ===
Unlike traditional Sunni Islam but like the modern Salafist movement, Ibadis do not have Sufi orders and reject the veneration of saints. Historically, the views of Sufis were not well regarded in Ibadi literature, with Ibadi scholars like Al-Mundhiri writing anti-Sufi works.

However, mystical devotional practices reminiscent of Sunni Sufism were traditionally practiced by some other Ibadi scholars, to whom miracles were sometimes ascribed as with Sunni Sufis. Modern Ibadis disagree on the appropriateness of these practices within the Ibadi creed, with some considering them an undesirable non-Ibadi influence on the faith while others continue to practice and teach them.

=== Views on early Islamic history ===
Ibadis agree with Sunnis, regarding Abu Bakr and Umar ibn al-Khattab as rightly-guided caliphs. They regard the first half of Uthman ibn Affan's rule as righteous and the second half as corrupt and affected by both nepotism and heresy. They approve of the first part of Ali's caliphate and (like Shī'a) disapprove of Aisha's rebellion and Mu'awiya's revolt. However, they regard Ali's acceptance of arbitration at the Battle of Ṣiffīn as rendering him unfit for leadership, and condemn him for killing the Kharijites of an-Nahr in the Battle of Nahrawan. Modern Ibadi theologians defend the early Kharijite opposition to Uthman, Ali and Mu'awiya.

In their belief, the next legitimate caliph and first Ibadi imam was Abd Allah ibn Wahb al-Rasibi, the leader of the Kharijites who turned against Ali for his acceptance of arbitration with Mu'awiya and was killed by Ali at Nahrawan. Ibadis believe that the "genealogy of Islam" (nasab al-islām) was transmitted by other individuals at Nahrawan, such as Hurqus ibn Zuhayr as-Sa'di, and developed into Ibadi Islam, the true form of the faith.

== Wahbi school ==
The Wahbi is the mainstream school of thought within Ibadism. The main reason the Wahbi strain has come to dominate within Ibadism is that most textual references that have been preserved can be attributed to Wahbi affiliated scholars.

=== Texts ===
The dating of early writings such as kutub al-rudud and siras (letters) written by Ibadis has led some analysts such as Salim al-Harithi to claim Ibadism as the oldest sect within Islam. However others suggest Ibadism only took on characteristics of a sect and a full-fledged madhab during the demise of the Rustamid Imamate.

=== Terminology ===
The term Wahbi is chiefly derived as an eponymous intimation to the teachings of Abd Allah ibn Wahb al-Rasibi. Although the term Wahbi was initially considered superfluous as Ibadism was largely homogenous, its usage increased upon the advent of the Nukkari secession in order to differentiate the Wahbis from the off-shoot Ibadis. The most common epithet Wahbi Ibadi clerics enjoined their adherents to apply to themselves is the term ahl al-istiqama meaning those on the straight path. They rejected the usage of ahl al-sunnah as early usage assigned the term sunnah as the practise of Muawiyah cursing Ali ibn Abi Talib from the pulpits, although during the Umayyad era, this meaning changed.

== Demographics ==
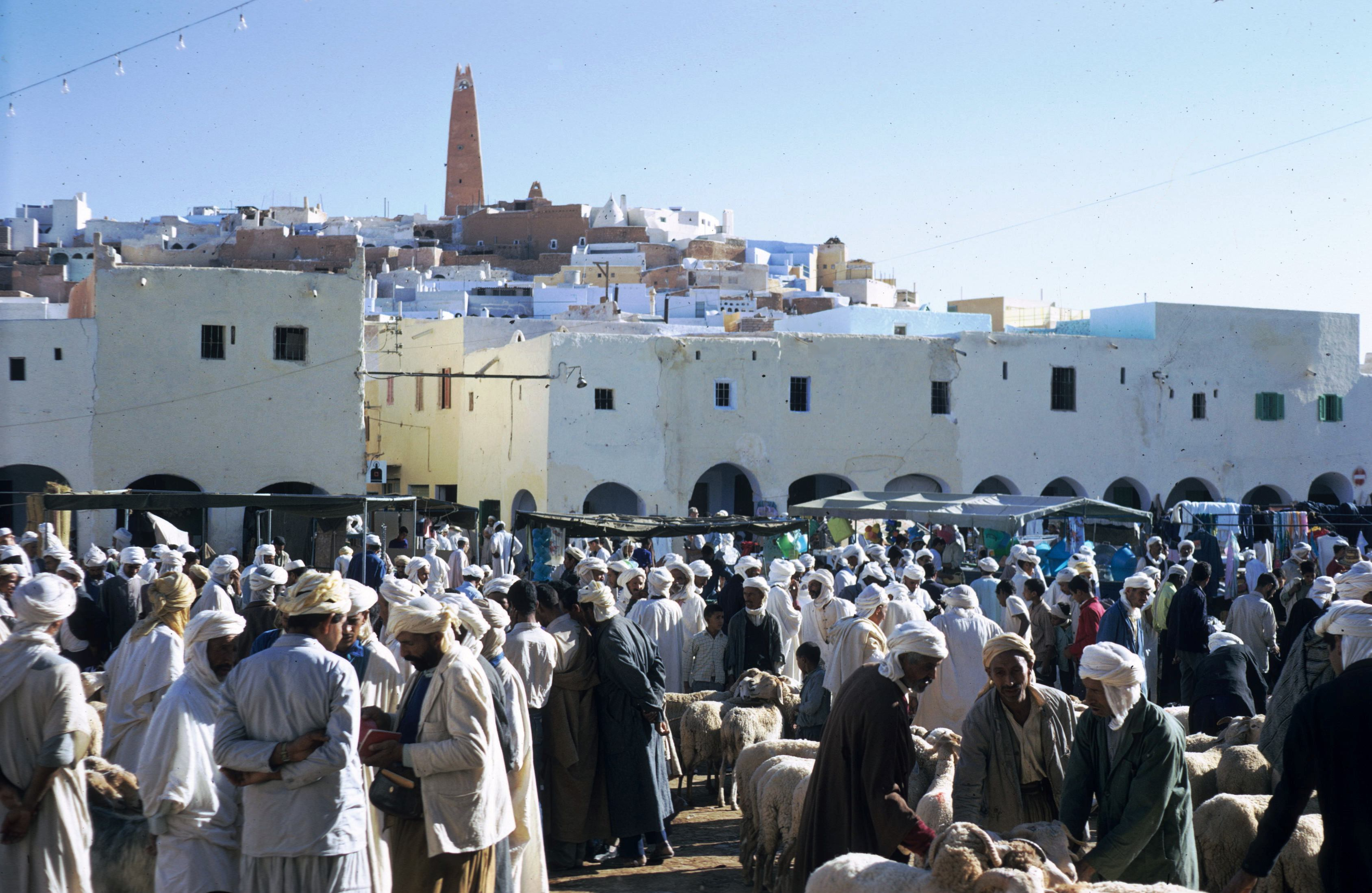
Ibadi people living in the M'zab valley in Algeria, in 1970

=== Middle East ===
Oman is the country with the most Ibadis; Ibadis and Sunnis make up equal numbers of Muslims (45% each), while Shia about 5%, in the population in Oman. There are roughly 3 million Ibadis worldwide, of which roughly 250,000 live outside Oman.

=== Africa ===
Historically, the early medieval Rustamid dynasty in Algeria was Ibadi, and refugees from its capital, Tiaret, founded the North African Ibadi communities, which still exist in M'zab. The Mozabites, a Berber ethnic group in the M'zab valley, are Ibadis. Ibadism also exists elsewhere in Africa, particularly in Zanzibar in Tanzania, and the Nafusa Mountains in Libya. They are also a minority in predominantly Sunni regions as the city of Ouargla and the island of Djerba.

Virtually all Ibadi Muslims today are Wahbi, although others include notable historic cults such as Nukkar and Azzabas.

=== Western countries ===
==== United Kingdom ====
London has a small Ibadi mosque called Jabir ibn Zayd Center, which was founded in 2014 by the Omani diaspora in the United Kingdom.

==== United States ====
A small-scale Ibadi dawah initiative has been led by Ahmed Memon, a convert to Ibadi Islam based in Texas.

== Notable Ibadis ==
=== Individuals ===
- Sulaiman al-Barouni, wali claimant of Tripolitania.
- Ahmed bin Hamad al-Khalili, current Grand Mufti of Oman.
- Qaboos bin Said al Said, former Sultan of Oman and its dependencies.
- Haitham bin Tariq al Said, reigning Sultan of Oman.
- Nūr al-Dīn al-Sālimī, scholar
- Jamshid bin Abdullah of Zanzibar, last reigning Sultan of Zanzibar
- Nouri Abusahmain, president of the former General National Congress and former Libyan head of state.
- Moufdi Zakaria, writer and nationalist, author of Kassaman the Algerian national anthem
- Ghalib Alhinai, last elected Imam (ruler) of the Imamate of Oman.
- 'Abd Allah ibn Wahb al-Rasibi, early Khārijite leader.
- Abd-Allah ibn Ibadh, a Tabi'i, (jurist).
- Jābir ibn Zayd, theologian from the second generation of Islam, who led the Ibadis after Abd-Allah ibn Ibadh died.
- Abu Yazid led a 10th century north African rebellion against the Fatimid Caliphate.
- Hunaina al-Mughairy former ambassador of Oman to the United States.

=== Dynasties ===
- Rustamid dynasty: 776–909
- Nabhani dynasty: 1154–1624
- Yaruba dynasty: 1624–1742
- Al Bu Said dynasty: since 1744
  - Zanzibari branch: 1856–1964

== See also ==
- Outline of Islam
- Glossary of Islam
- Index of Islam-related articles
- Ghardaïa
- Islam in Oman
- Sultanate of Zanzibar
