= Haji Piyada Mosque =

Former mosque in Afghanistan

- د حاجي پیاده جومات آرامگاه حاجى پياده بابا
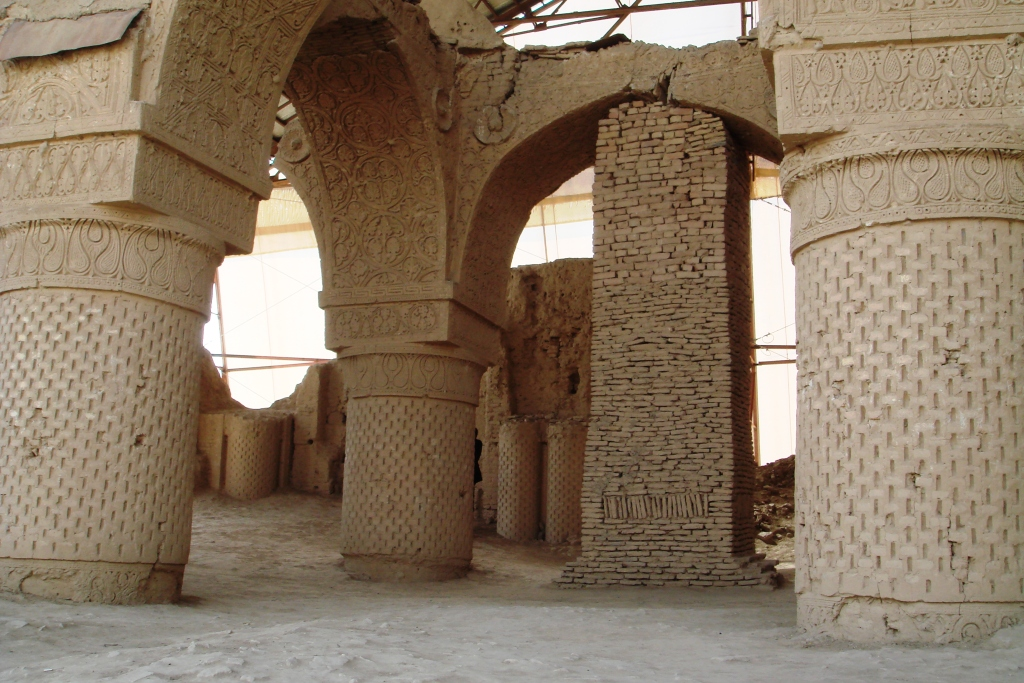
- The former mosque ruins in 2008

- Location of the mosque ruins in Afghanistan

Religion
- Affiliation: Islam (former)
- Ecclesiastical or organisational status: Mosque (partially destroyed)
- Status: Closed (in ruins)

Location
- Location: Near Balkh, Balkh Province
- Country: Afghanistan
- Interactive map of Haji Piyada Mosque
- Coordinates: 36°43′47″N 66°53′7″E

Architecture
- Style: Abbasid
- Completed: c. 8th or 9th centuries CE

Specifications
- Length: 20 m (66 ft)
- Width: 20 m (66 ft)
- Dome: Nine (since destroyed)
- Shrine: One: (Haji Piyada)
- Materials: Stucco

The Haji Piyada Mosque (Note: Pashto: د حاجي پیاده جومات Dari: مسجد حاجى پياده) (lit. 'Mosque of the walking pilgrim') or Noh Gonbad Mosque (Note: Pashto: د نوح ګنبد جومات Dari: مسجد نُه‌گنبد) (lit. 'Mosque of Nine Cupolas') is an historic former mosque, now in a partial ruinous state, located near Balkh, in the Balkh province of northern Afghanistan. It is thought to be the oldest Islamic building in Afghanistan, dating to the 9th century or possibly to the late 8th century.

== History ==
The construction of the mosque has been traditionally attributed to the 9th century, based on its similarities with the Abbasid style of Samarra. A more recent study by archeologist Chahryar Adle proposes that the mosque was built earlier, in 794, based on a reading of historical sources, on estimates obtained from radiocarbon dating, and on a re-analysis of the decorative style. According to this hypothesis, the mosque was built on the orders of the Barmakid governor of Khorasan at the time, Fazl ibn Yahya, appointed by the Abbasid caliph Harun al-Rashid. According to Adle, the mosque was also built inside the precinct of a large, pre-existing Buddhist religious complex called Now-Bahar, which had been under the care of the Barmakid family for generations before this.

The mosque was severely damaged by earthquakes over time, possibly as soon as the year 819. All of the mosque's domes have since collapsed. The site was listed on the World Monuments Fund's 2006 World Monuments Watch list of 100 Most Endangered Sites. Prior to this, a metal roof had already been erected over the ruins of the mosque to protect it from the elements, as the structure is vulnerable to erosion.

In 2006, based on a request from Afghan authorities, UNESCO, and the French Archaeological Delegation in Afghanistan (DAFA), the site was visited by a team of experts and a representative of the Aga Khan Trust for Culture. In 2009, the conservation of the site was launched on the initiative of the Aga Khan Trust for Culture and funded by US Embassy in Kabul, Afghanistan. Reconstruction was coordinated by several scholars from the University of Florence in Italy. The first phase of work was completed in 2011. As part of the project, a larger temporary metal roof was constructed to protect the site from rain, wind and other natural disasters.

== Description ==
The building measures 20 by 20 metres (66 by 66 ft). The outside walls are of mud-brick construction. The interior is divided into nine bays, each originally covered by a dome. The columns and the arches that divide the bays are decorated in deeply carved stucco, depicting a wide variety of designs, stylistically comparable to Abbasid decoration in Mesopotamia.

Pilgrims visit the tomb of saint, Haji Piyada, who was also buried there.

== Stucco Decorations ==
The stucco decorations of the mosque constitute one of its most significant surviving elements, preserving deeply carved vegetal scrolls, vine-leaf motifs, and geometric interlaced pattern on the remaining columns and arches. This decoration is consistent with broader assessments of the site's early Islamic decorative language. According to Archnet, the program incorporates motifs associated with both early Abbasid and proto-Samanid artistic traditions. Comparative studies frequently relate the stucco at Haji Piyada to that of Abbasid Samarra, where similar abstracted vegetal and bevelled designs appear; Mobini's analysis underscores this parallel, citing a shared progression from realism to abstractionism. Boostani and colleagues further argue that the ornamentation represents a masterpiece of early Islamic architecture, reflecting patterns of artistic exchange across Central Asia in the eighth and ninth centuries. Conservation reports by the Aga Khan Development Network highlight the fragility of the surviving plasterwork and emphasize its importance as rare material evidence of early Islamic stucco production in Afghanistan.

== Gallery ==
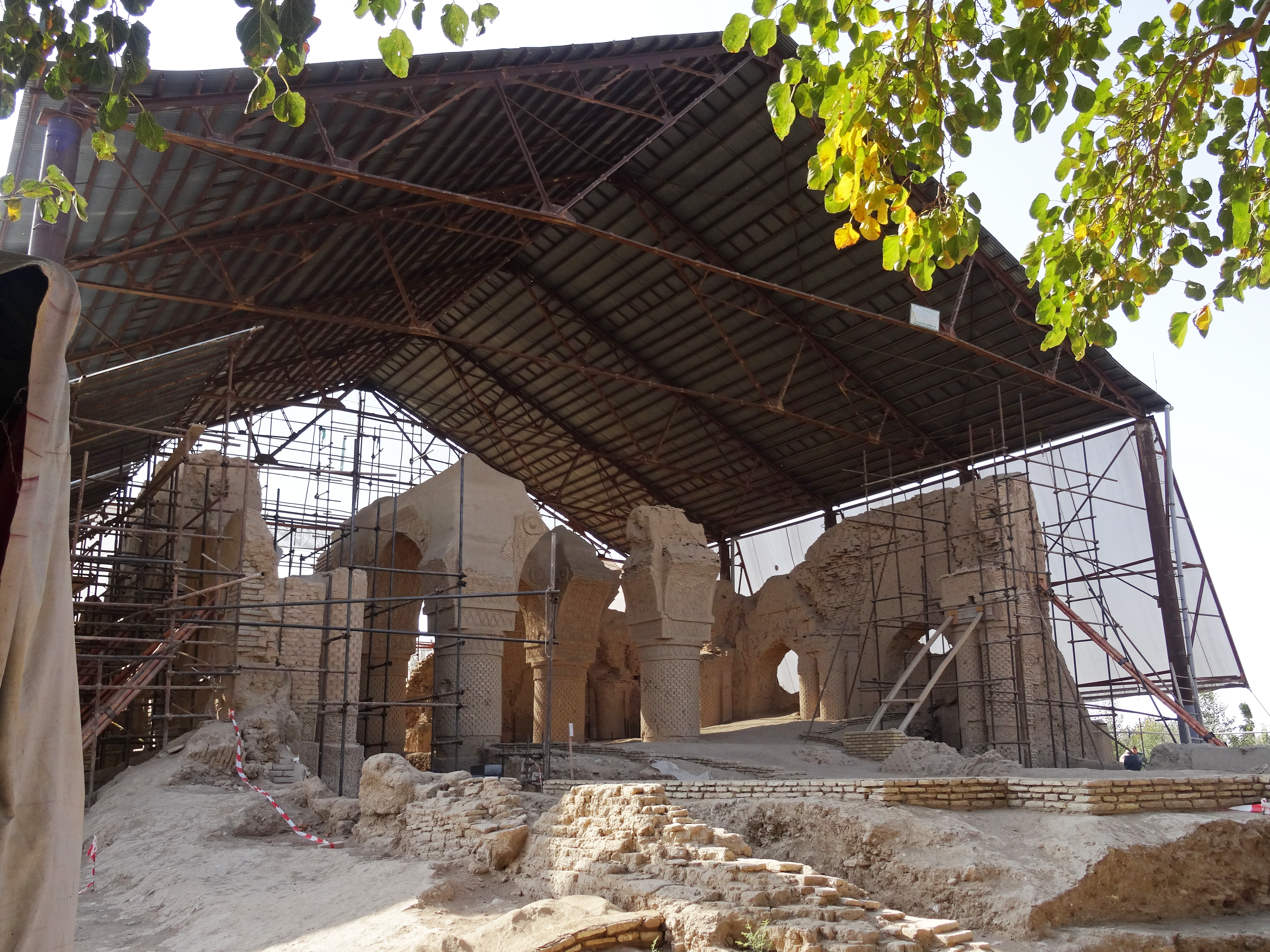
View of the site in 2016

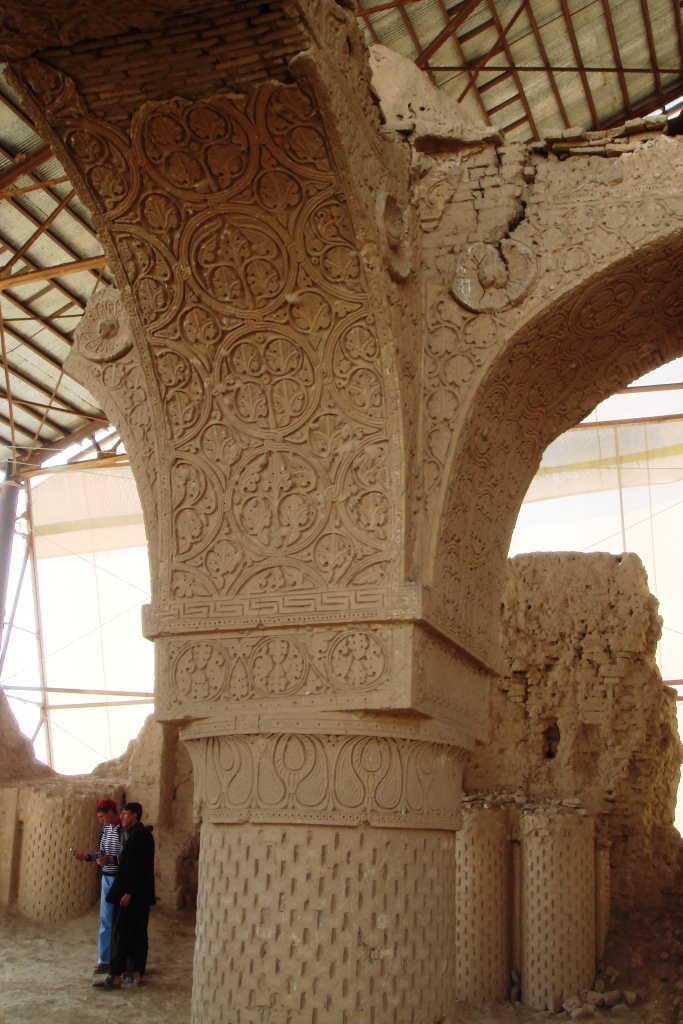
Detail of the stucco decoration inside the mosque

== See also ==
- Islam in Afghanistan
- List of mosques in Afghanistan
- Early medieval domes
