= Ibadi theology =

Branch of Islamic theology

Ibāḍī theology refers to the study of God within the Ibāḍī branch of Islam, and shares a path with Islamic theology. Although the school was founded in Basra, modern-day Iraq, its followers subsequently sought refuge in Oman, Yemen, Hadramawt in the southeast peninsula of Arabia, and North Africa. Though largely ignored by the mainstream of Arab and Muslim scholarship, and scarcely tapped by Orientalist research, there does exist a continuous tradition of Ibāḍī scholarship throughout the centuries to this day.

== Philosophy of Ibāḍī theology ==
The development of Ibāḍī theology, also known as Ibāḍī Kalām (an approach to Islamic theology likened to scholasticism), can be traced to the works of scholars and imams of the Ibāḍī community, whose histories, lives, and personalities form part of the greater Islamic history. Ibāḍī theology can be understood on the basis of the works of theologians Ibn Ibāḍ, Jābir bin Zayd, Abū 'Ubaida, Rabī' b. Ḥabīb, and Abū Sufyān among others. Although Ibāḍīsm was extinguished in Basra, the foundation of the Ibāḍī community, in the late 2nd century AH (ca. 8th century CE), the Ibadi teachers of Basra and their works continue to constitute sources of inspiration for the life and teaching of the Ibāḍī community. For this reason, Ibāḍī teaching is difficult to properly understand without an awareness of the life, history, and personalities of the Basra community and a knowledge of the growth of the various Ibāḍī communities that were mainly established in southern Arabia, Oman, North Africa, and East Africa

Ibāḍīs today prefer to be known using the term Muḥakkima, and consider themselves their descendants. However, they reject the extreme tendencies of the Khawārij, differentiating themselves from insurgents and extremists. This position is expressed explicitly by the "most prominent Ibāḍī Kalām theologian" of the 2nd century AH (ca. 8th century CE), 'Abd Allāh b. Yazīd al-Fazārī, in the only surviving folio of his brief work K. al-Futyā.

The basic principles of Ibāḍī theology do not differ from those of the other Islamic schools, the madhāhib, but it has its own identity which, for Ibāḍīs, is the true Islamic identity. Ibāḍīs say the Qur'an is the fundamental source of Islamic faith and life. They also value the aḥādīth of the Muhammad and his companions (Ṣaḥāba), who preached and interpreted the Qur'an in the Muslim community. The Ibāḍī approach to the theological, legal and social problems that develop in various Qur'anic verses is based on the words and traditions of Muhammad and the traditions of his companions and their students.

== The imamate of Basra ==
Following the example of their first Imam, Jabir ibn. Zayd, Ibāḍī theologians find support for their views in a large number of companions of Muhammad, particularly ʻAbdullāh b. Al-'Abbās, Muhammad's cousin and an interpreter of the Qur'an. ʻAbdullāh b. Al-'Abbās was one of the first Muslims to undertake the interpretation (Tafsīr) of the Qur'an. The raʼy method of Qu'ran interpretation used by ʻAbdullāh b. Al-'Abbās was subsequently adopted by Ibāḍī and Muʻtazila scholars to metaphorically interpret the various Qur'anic names for God and to avoid tashbīh (anthropomorphisms).

An important contribution to the Ibāḍīs' theology came from the third Imam, Al-Rabīʻ b. Ḥabīb b. ʻAmr al Farāhīdī, who incorporated the aḥādīth (the sayings and teachings of the Prophet Muhammad) into the āthār of the Ibāḍī community. From the beginning, learned men and spiritual leaders of the Ibāḍī community developed a spiritual and intellectual movement which closely followed the religious, political, and social ideas of Islam, and elaborated on religious and theological teachings on all matters related to Islamic society. The Ibāḍī movement sees itself as the guardian of Islam against the secularisation of power (the Muhakkima). As such, it developed—together with the Muʻtazila movement—a rich theology that transformed Classical and Late Antiquity to the demands of the prophetic word.

Ibāḍī theology embraces the fundamental principles of Islam, and purports to be based on the Qur'an, the Prophet Muhammad, and his companions (Ṣaḥāba, tābiʻūn wa tābiʻūn at-tābiʻūn), the life and works of which were incorporated into the āthār of the Ibāḍī community. The major theological and philosophical issues facing the community relate to God, the world, and human nature, and were negotiated in the Ibāḍī community by its leaders and teachers. Belief in one God is the foundation of Ibāḍīsm. Faith means confession that God is absolutely one, i.e., confession of absolute monotheism (tawḥīd). Ibāḍī theology, therefore, includes teachings about God, His creation, and humans, and discusses the essence and existence of God on one hand and, on the other, His relationship to His creation and creatures, especially his rational creature, the human being. These fundamental teachings of faith constitute the "roots" (uṣūl) or the "principles" of Ibāḍī theology, which are called uṣūl (singular, aṣl) or ʻaqāʼid (ʻaqīda).

The Ibāḍīs, according to their narratives, were one of the first to approach the Qur'anic passages and formulate the basic theological principles of Islam. They gave great weight to the 112th sura of the Qur'an entitled "Surat al-Ikhlās" or "Surat at-Tawhīd" which declares the believer's sincerity with all purity of heart for his faith in the one God, i.e., true monotheism.

بسم الله الرحمن الرحيم

قُلْ هُوَ اللَّهُ أَحَدٌ ١

اللَّهُ الصَّمَدُ ٢

لَمْ يَلِدْ وَلَمْ يُولَدْ ٣

وَلَمْ يَكُن لَّهُ كُفُوًا أَحَدٌ ٤

Transliteration:

Bismillah ir-Rahman ir-Raheem 1 Qul huwa Allahu ahad

2 Allah hu samad

3 Lam yalid wa lam yulad

4 Wa lam yakun lahu kufuwan ahad

In the name of God, Most Gracious, Most Merciful

Say: He is Allah, the One and Only!

Allah, the Eternal, Absolute;

He begetteth not, nor is He begotten.

And there is none like unto Him.

With this surat and other Qur'anic passages, Ibāḍī theology emphasizes that God is the only being that has no resemblance to His creatures. Nevertheless, God is the creator of the world, and He is the One Who reveals the law and the truth in the Qur'an and cares for His people. Because "He is the kingdom of the heavens and the earth, it is He Who gives life and causes death; and He is Able to do all things. He is the First (nothing is before Him) and the Last (nothing is after Him), the Highest (nothing is above Him) and the Nearest (nothing is nearer than Him). And He is the All-Knower of everything. He is Who created the heavens and the earth in six Days and then Istawā (rose over) the Throne (in a manner that suits His Majesty)" (Surat 57, 2–4). This is a passage that describes God's greatness and omnipotence, and the Ibāḍīs interpreted it allegorically (Taʼwīl) to avoid anthropomorphism. The Ibāḍīs applied the same interpretation to all the Qur'anic "beautiful names" (al-asmāʼ al-ḥusnā) that refer to the hand of God (al-yad) to express His power, and the eye (ʻayn) to indicate His global supervision. The image of God sitting on His throne (istiwāʼ ʻalā al-ʻarsh) was interpreted as His governance of the universe. They particularly repudiated the idea of the vision of God (ru'ya) at the eschaton.

== Main doctrines ==
Ibāḍī theology emphasizes the unintelligible and impersonal nature of the divine essence, and asserts that God's being is inseparable from His essence. God's being, however, becomes concrete when it is connected to the Divine names and Divine properties that are made manifest in the moral and physical order of the world. God, therefore, has 99 beautiful names, because He, the "odd" (al-witr), loves these names. The 100th name is dhāt, the essence of God, which cannot be contained in the human mind, and is therefore unknown and inconceivable. It constitutes His internal hypostasis. God, however, is made known to the world with the rest of the names that He revealed in the Qur'an and with which He communicates with His creatures. The names of God are neither identical with God, nor different from Him (hal asmāʼ Allāh hiya huwa am ghayruh). The names are not part of God, nor are they added to the divine essence, since thus God would be divided. God, however, is not portioned; He is one and indivisible. In this sense, the attributes of His essence are eternal. The names, however, that we ascribe to God are our own words and, as such, are created concepts. The attributes of God, therefore, are external characteristics created by man and ascribed to God's essence from outside, and are, therefore, not eternal.

To distinguish between the eternal God and his non-eternal or created attributes, the Ibāḍīs used Aristotelian terms that had entered into Arabic philosophy, viz., the terms jawhar (substance) and ʻaraḍ (accident). The essence of God is single and eternal while His attributes are created accidents which are added to it from the outside. Similarly, the question arose whether the Qur'an was created or uncreated. The Ashʻarite and Sunni teachings profess that the Qur'an is the word of God and therefore eternal and uncreated. The Ibāḍīs tend toward the Mu'tazilite position and believe that the Qur'an is the created word of God. As with the Christians, the Muslims too adopted the arguments of Greek philosophy, particularly Aristotelian logic, to support their positions. It is worth emphasising that, from as early as the 7th century, Islamic theology was familiar not only with the terms "essence" and "accident" from Aristotelian logic, but generally also with its syllogisms.

A major, related problem is God's justice (ʻadl), which was widely discussed by Ibāḍī theologians. The issue that arose surrounded God's relationship to the Ibāḍī community and the faithful's relationship to God and their fellow men. For the Ibāḍī community, the concepts of walāya (friendship/communication) and barāʼa (excommunication) were of the greatest importance. Which of the faithful and members of the community are worthy of walāya and which of barā'a, and why? What is the relationship between faith and unbelief (īmān wa kufr)? Who is a muʼmīn (believer) and who a munafiq (hypocrite) and what is kufr an-niʻma (unfaithfulness or ingratitude)? Another issue discussed was the question of qadar (free will) and good deeds. The question of qadar, regarding divine decision and free will, was one of the main issues within the first Ibāḍī community. Many debates took place between the Ibāḍīs, the Qadariya, and the Mu'atazila. Some Ibāḍīs, like al-Fazārī of the 8th century, were critical of determinism.

The Ibāḍiyya came to consider other Muslims as merely hypocrites (munāfiqūn) and neglecters of the true faith (kuffār), not as mushrikūn, or those who worship gods other than the singular god. As such they allowed social intercourse, intermarriage, and mutual inheritance, but not religious association (walāya, tawallī) with them. They mostly abstained from the armed revolt against the Umayyad government until the ʿAbbasid revolution in 127 AH, or 746 CE.

In the twenty-first century, atomic theory was adopted by Islamic schools, including the Ibāḍī, to prove the existence of God. According to this theory, God is one, indivisible, and eternal. He is to be distinguished from every other atom in the universe, with which He has no similarity. In this sense, God is ʻayn, the primordial atom, the subject of God (dhāt), beside which there is no other atom, i.e., a second subject. God constitutes the identity of predicates.

Some authors of this period contribute substantially to the formulation of early Islamic thought, whose ideas are characterised by a rationalist reconciliation, understanding, and engagement of Islamic theology. Their contribution is important not only to the systematization of the Ibāḍī madhhab but also to the renaissance and promotion of dialectics within Islamic theology that would later lead to its systematization by the several Islamic schools. It is particularly important to note that early Ibāḍī and Mu'tazilite thought that predates the formative Islamic period (and which often remains opaque to modern researchers) utilized philosophy from the classical period and Early Antiquity, imbuing old notions—such as the aforementioned ones of substance, atoms, essence, attributes, etc.—with new meanings.

What can be understood from the ideas of the early Ibāḍīs and Mu'tazila is that their ideas helped diversify Islamic intellectual and theological discourse. They have had an important impact on the history of the Muslim world; their contribution was the codification of Islam. Ibāḍīs also created a rational discourse that promoted the study and hermeneutics of Islamic texts and scriptures. Some of the thinkers in the Muslim world came out from this movement, either inspired by or opposed to it. Ibāḍīs are still producing writings and theology in contrast to the Mu'atazila, who have been lost to Muslim history. Recent research focuses on these issues in all their dimensions from the beginnings of the Ibāḍī community and until the 12th century.
