= Sedrata, Ouargla =

Archaeological site in Algeria

Sedrata
- سدراتة (Arabic)
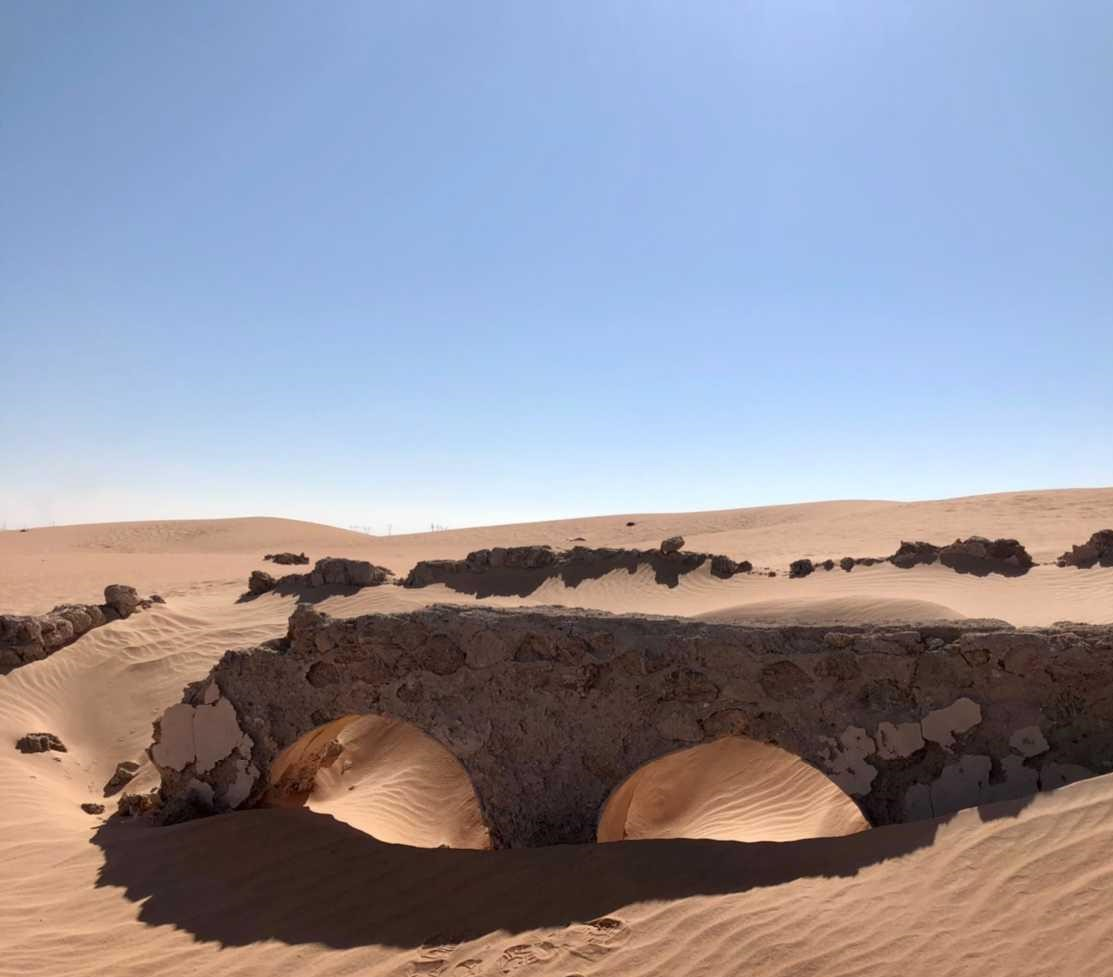
- Sedrata ruins

- Location within Algeria
- 31.8°N 5.4°E
- Type: Settlement
- Location: Ouargla, Algeria

Sedrata (Arabic: سدراتة) was a historic city and archaeological site located approximately 14 km south of modern-day Ouargla, Algeria. Founded in the early 10th century, it served as a refuge and interim capital for the Ibadi community (the Rustumids) following the destruction of their capital, Tihert, by the Fatimids in 909 CE.

== History ==
While the region shows signs of Neolithic occupation, a vast historical "black hole" exists until the late 9th century. The city’s Islamic history began when Sadrata (Zenata groups from the north) settled in the basin, bringing with them Ibadi doctrine. Following the fall of the Rustumid imamate of Tihert in 909, the city became a vital bastion of Ibadism and a refuge for the last members of the dynasty, such as Imam Ya'qub ibn Aflah.
