= Abu Sahl al-Farisi al-Nafusi =

Berber Ibadi poet and translator

- Born: c. 9th century CE (3rd century AH); Unknown
- Died: c. 912–960 CE (early 4th century AH); Marsa al-Dajaj (possible location)
- Known for: Early poetic works related to the history of the Ibadi community; Translator for Rustumid rulers
- Notable work: Diwan (12 books in Berber language)
- Movement: Ibadism
- Relatives: Abd al-Rahman ibn Rustum (possible ancestor)
- Family: Rustumid dynasty (possible connection)

Abu Sahl al-Farisi al-Nafusi (Arabic: أبو سهل الفارسي النفوسي; c. 9th century CE – c. 912–960 CE) was a Muslim Ibadi Berber poet and translator, known for his poetry mourning the fall of the Ibadite Rustumid Imamate in North Africa. Born into the Nafusi Berber tribe, it is believed that he may have had connections to the Rustumid family, with some sources suggesting he was a descendant of the Rustumid family. Despite his Arabic epithet al-Farisi meaning the Persian, Abu Sahl was of Berber origin.

Abu Sahl served as a translator for the Rustumid rulers, notably translating between Berber and Arabic. After the fall of the Rustumid capital, Tihert, to the Fatimid invasions, he sought refuge on the Algerian coast, possibly in Marsa al-Dajaj. There, he spent his later years composing his most notable work, a diwan (poetic collection) of 12 books in Berber, chronicling the history of the Ibadis and lamenting their decline.

Much of his work was lost after the burning of Qal'at Darjin in 1040, where Ibadi manuscripts were preserved. Efforts by Ibadi scholar Abdullah bin Muhammed al-Lawati (1040–1134) to recover fragments of his poetry were partially successful, and subsequent attempts by modern scholar Ali Yahya Muammar (1919–1980) to locate these fragments were not fruitful.

Abu Sahl's poetry is regarded as one of the earliest poetic compositions in the Berber language, and if discovered, it could be of significant historical importance for understanding the Ibadite community and the Rustumid period.

== Background and origins ==
Abu Sahl al-Nafusi lived during the 3rd century AH (9th century CE), a time when the Ibadite Rustumid dynasty ruled in North Africa. He witnessed the changes that occurred following the dynasty's decline, which ultimately ended with the Shia Muslim Fatimid invasions.

Despite the Arabic epithet al-Farisi meaning the Persian, which might suggest Persian origins, it is believed that Abu Sahl's mother may have been linked to the Rustumid family. This dynasty, some sources claim, had Persian roots, potentially connecting her lineage to his. However, historical records confirm that Abu Sahl was not Persian. Instead, he was a Nafusi Berber, as indicated by his second epithet, al-Nafusi, which signifies his Berber ancestry.

Polish Orientalist Tadeusz Lewicki further supports the idea that Abu Sahl's father was a Nafusi Berber. Some sources also indicate that Abu Sahl's father was the son of Mimoun, who in turn was the son of Abd al-Wahhab, the son of Abd al-Rahman ibn Rustum, the first ruler of the Rustamid Imamate. Similarly, Tunisian historian Othman Kaak also notes that Abu Sahl may have been one of the grandsons of Abd al-Rahman ibn Rustum. Another version of the story suggests that both his father and mother were directly linked to the Rustumid family.

== Rustumid translator ==
Historical Ibadi sources indicate that Abu Sahl, known for his fluency in Berber, served as a translator. He is believed to have worked for either the third Rustumid ruler, Aflah ibn Abd al-Wahhab (r. 824–872), or his grandson, Yusuf Abu Hatim ibn Muhammad (r. 894–897, 899–906), particularly in Berber.

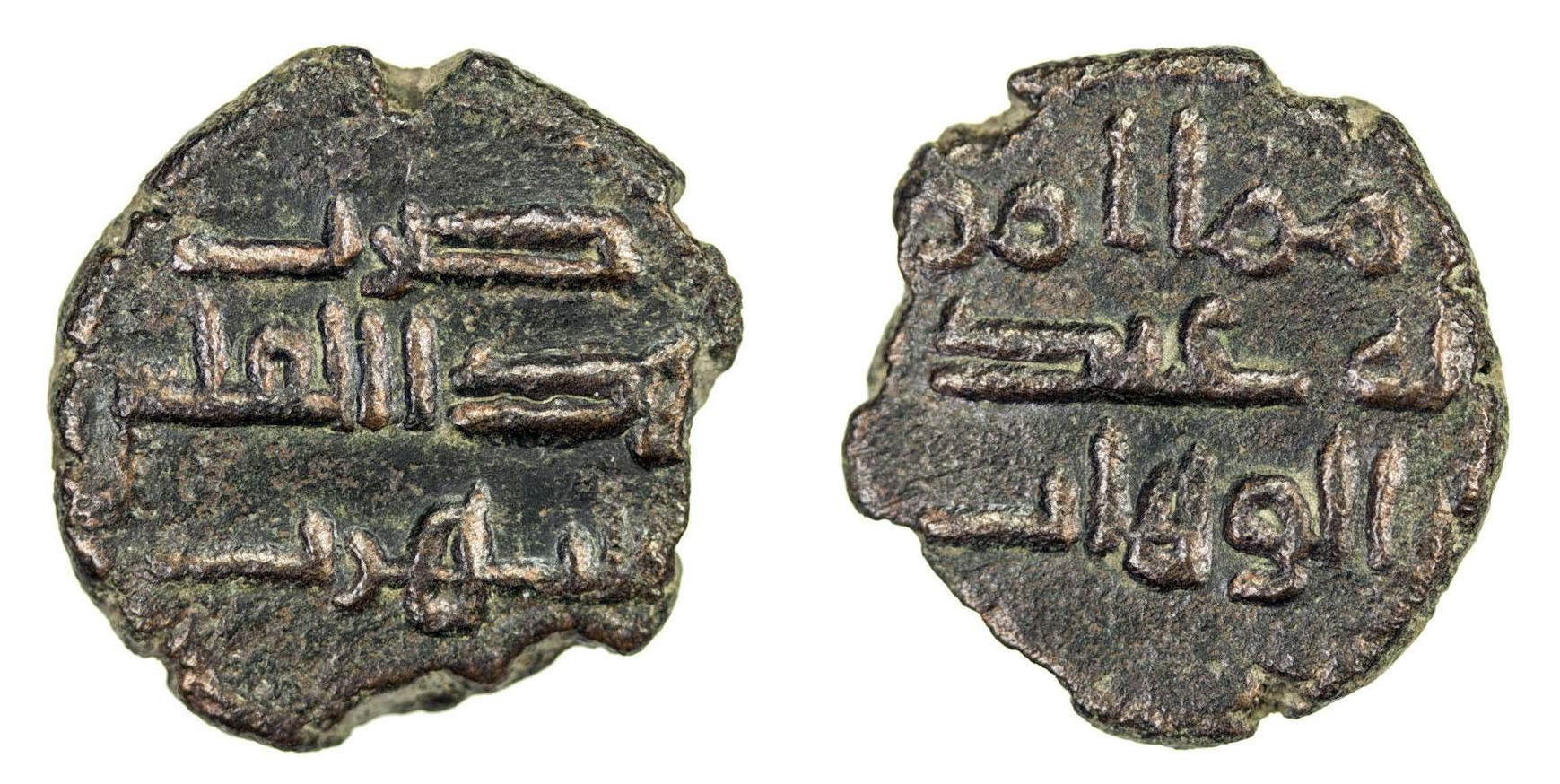
Fals minted in Tihert in the name of Aflah ibn Abd al-Wahhab, whom Abu Sahl is presumed to have translated for.

Contemporary Libyan scholar Ali Yahya Muammar believes that Abu Sahl translated for Yusuf Abu Hatim ibn Muhammad, not for his grandfather Aflah ibn Abd al-Wahhab. Muammar suggests that Abu Sahl was likely too young to serve Aflah. Algerian historian Ibrahim Bahaz proposes that Abu Sahl may have translated Arabic letters from the Rustumids into Berber for local governors in their provinces.

After the fall of Tihert (in modern-day Algeria), the Rustumid dynasty's seat of power, to the Fatimid offensives, Abu Sahl is believed to have sought refuge along the Algerian coast. Historical sources suggest two possible locations for his resettlement: Marsa al-Kharraz and Marsa al-Dajaj. Ahmad al-Darjini (d. 1270 CE) argues that Abu Sahl settled in Marsa al-Dajaj rather than Marsa al-Kharraz. He reinforces his claim by stating:

It is reported that the tomb of Abu Sahl is located in the aforementioned place [Marsa al-Dajaj] and continues to be visited. Indeed, at the time, the Sanhaja used to visit him, and some of them would say: 'Let us go to the grave of the one who laments his sin and his faith.' This supports that he was in Jazaʾir Bani Mazghannan, as it is the land of the Sanhaja.

Abu Sahl lived there in seclusion, dedicating himself to worship and composing poetry mourning the losses suffered by the Muslim community after the end of Ibadite rule. People visited him until his death, which likely occurred in the early 4th AH century (between 912 and 960 CE).

== Lost works ==
It is believed that Abu Sahl authored a diwan comprising 12 books in the Berber language, featuring poetic compositions that chronicle the history of the Ibadis (Ahl al-Daʿwa) in North Africa. His works take the form of elegies lamenting the fall of the Ibadi Rustumid Imamate, expressing profound sorrow for the faith, its followers, and their decline. According to Ahmad Al-Darjini, a figure named Said, from al-Nukkariyya, took 6 books from this collection without authorization.

Upon discovering that Abu Sahl had dedicated his work to their community, the Ibadis sent a messenger to retrieve the collection from Said. The recovered portions, along with the remaining poems, were compiled into a single volume stored in Qal'at Darjin (in modern-day Tunisia). However, when the city was captured in 1040 (440 AH), all Ibadi manuscripts housed there, including Abu Sahl's collection, were burned and subsequently lost.

In the aftermath of this loss, the Ibadi scholar Abdullah bin Muhammed al-Lawati (c. 1040–1134) sought to recover the poems from the memories of the Ibadis (Azzabas) who had once memorized them. He successfully retrieved 24 poetic chapters (bab) from the diwan. However, this process led to distortions and imbalances in the texts, resulting in inconsistencies, as well as various additions and omissions.

Ali Yahya Muammar has made considerable efforts to find the poetic pieces once gathered by Abu Abdullah. He expresses regret over the loss of many of these works, noting that "it is unfortunate that these poetic pieces, even those collected by Abdullah, have been lost. I have exerted all my efforts to find some of those poems. One of the mistakes made by many historians, in my opinion, is that they did not work to transcribe those references in their original languages". While other scholars, Ibn Idris Mustafa and Ibn Muhammad ibn Salih, suggest that it is possible that some of the Berber poetry compiled in Arabic and found in Ahmad al-Darjini's book Kitab Tabaqat al-Mashayikh bil-Maghrib may be derived from this diwan.

Ibrahim Bahaz posits that "the poetry of Abu Sahl possesses significant historical value, despite its composition in the Berber language. As noted by al-Darjini, this poetry includes passages that document events pertinent to the Ibadi community (Ahl al-Daʿwa) and laments the demise of the Rustumid imamate".

Abu Sahl's poetic works are among the earliest known compositions in the Berber language. Abdullah bin Muhammed al-Lawati asserted that those interested in Arabic poetry should seek the poems of Imran ibn Hittan, a notable Kharijite poet, while those interested in Berber poetry should explore the verses of Abu Sahl al-Farisi.

== See also ==
- Ibn al-Saghir
