= Abd al-Rahman ibn Rustam =

- Imam
- Reign: 776/777 or 778/779–784/785
- Successor: Abd al-Wahhab ibn Abd al-Rahman
- Born: c. 729–730; Iraq, Umayyad Caliphate
- Died: c. 784–785
- House: Rustamid dynasty

Abd al-Rahman ibn Rustam (Arabic: عبد الرحمن ابن رستم; c. 8th century, d. c.784–785) was an Ibadi leader and the first imam associated with the polity later known as the Rustamid Imamate in the Maghreb, whose capital and principal center of rule was established at Tihert (near modern Tiaret, in present-day Algeria).

After building his reputation within the Ibadi networks of Ifriqiya (with formative links to eastern Ibadi scholarship), Abd al-Rahman became a key leader for Ibadi communities seeking autonomy from caliphal authority. Proclaimed imam by Ibadi groups around 776–777 (some chronologies place the decisive phase slightly later), he ruled until his death and was succeeded by his son Abd al-Wahhab, beginning the Rustumid dynasty that lasted until the Fatimid conquest in 909.

== Origins ==
Ibadi historical narratives portray Abd al-Rahman ibn Rustum as a descendant of the Sassanids, specifically as the son of the commander Rostam Farrokhzad who fought at al-Qadisiyah. However, this is likely a legend rather than fact. Other authors, such as al-Bakri (11th century), Ibn Idhari (14th century), and Ibn Khaldun (14th century), adopted this misconception.

== Early life ==
Ibadi sources generally describe Abd al-Rahman as having been born in present-day Iraq or at least originating from there. According to the narrative, his father, Rustum, was an astrologer who predicted that one of his descendants would one day rule the Maghreb. Inspired by this prophecy, Rustum is said to have left Iraq with his wife and son to settle in the Maghreb. However, during their journey, he reportedly died in Mecca or its surroundings. His widow later met Maghrebi pilgrims in Mecca, married a man from al-Qayrawan, and eventually traveled to the Maghreb, where she settled with him in the city.

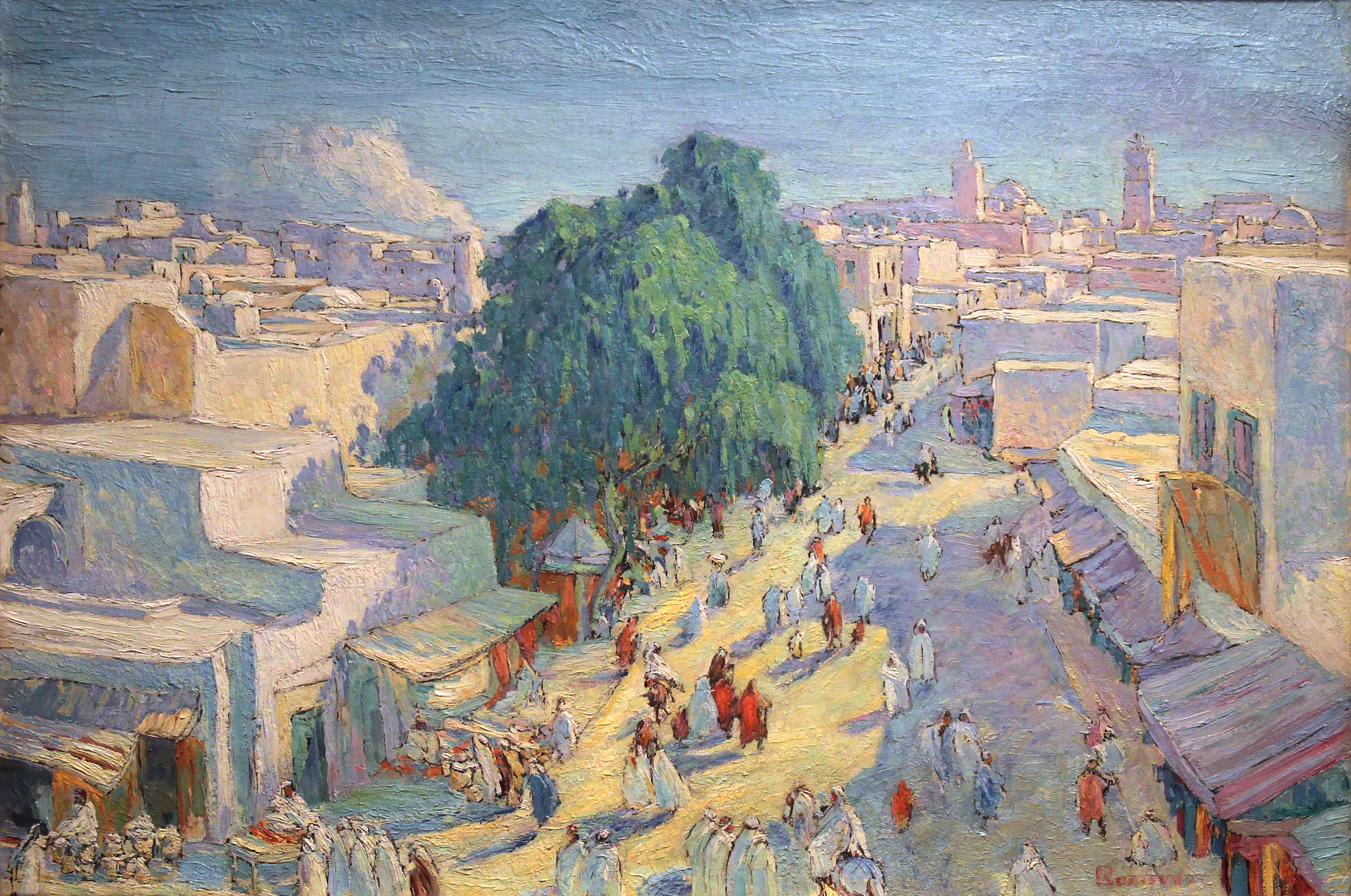
Al-Qayrawan, the city where Abd al-Rahman was raised, would later serve as the backdrop for the arrival of the Ibadi preacher Salama ibn Sa'd (Musée du Quai Branly – Jacques Chirac)

The Algerian scholar Ibrahim ibn Bakir Bahaz considers the part about Abd al-Rahman's father prophecy to be more legend than historical fact. He suggests that this could explain why Ahmad al-Shammakhi, another Ibadi writer, does not mention the prophecy instead reporting that Rustum traveled to Mecca to perform the pilgrimage (hajj) and died there. Similarly, the French scholar Cyrille Aillet argues that the elements linking Abd al-Rahman's birthplace to Iraq, as well as the story of his family's journey to the Maghreb, which is portrayed as the future cradle of Islam, are later narrative constructs. He believes these details were likely invented by the Ibadi memorialist Abu Zakariyya al-Warjlani to fill gaps in Abd al-Rahman's biography and to symbolically present his family's migration as a reflection of the union between the Islamic East (Mashriq) and West (Maghreb).

Available historical sources tell us little about the youth and early life of Abd al-Rahman, leaving this part of his story mostly unknown. It is known, however, that he was raised in al-Qayrawan, in what is now Tunisia. The city, a major Islamic center in the Maghreb at the time, likely provided him access to scholars and opportunities for learning. However, historical sources offer little detail about this period of his early life.

== Background ==
Following the Umayyad persecution of the Ibadis (moderate sect of Kharijites) and their doctrine in the Mashriq, they sought distant regions far from the caliphate's political centers, focusing primarily on the Maghreb. The region offered fertile ground for their teachings, as the local populations strongly rejected the harsh treatment imposed by the Umayyad governors and opposed the hereditary caliphal system. Within this context, the first waves of Kharijites made their way to the Maghreb.

By the early 8th century, following the persecution by the Umayyad governor al-Hajjaj ibn Yusuf (r. 694–714), the Kharijites such as the Ibadis made their way into North Africa. The Maghreb, became a destination for these early waves of Kharijite settlers. Ibadi historical sources tell us that Salama ibn Sa’d and Ikrima ibn Abd Allah arrived together during this period, with Salama Preaching Ibadism and Ikrima advocating for Sufrism. This narrative is primarily reported by Abu Zakariyya al-Warjlani as one that was circulating in his time and attributed to the Rustumid Imam Aflah ibn Abd al-Wahhab. These two figures are frequently portrayed as the early representatives of Ibadism and Sufrism in North Africa.

However, the historical narrative surrounding their arrival is not without controversy, Elizabeth Savage refers to the two preachers as semi-legendary, while historian Jamil Abun-Nasr raises doubts about the veracity of Ikrima ibn Abd Allah’s presence alongside Salama ibn Sa’d in al-Qayrawan. Al-Rashidi estimates that the early ideas of the Kharijites, including Ibadite and Sufrite ideologies, were likely present in the Maghreb before the arrival of Salama ibn Sa’d. It is most probable, however, that Ibadism and Sufrism were more firmly introduced to the region following the Battle of Nahrawan. Despite these uncertainties, the narrative symbolize the early waves of Kharijite migration from the Mashriq (the eastern Islamic world) to the Maghreb, laying the groundwork for the spread of these religious movements. As these new settlers integrated into the region, various Berber tribes gradually began to adopt Ibadism. Yet, it remains unclear how much Salama ibn Sa’d's activities directly influenced the conversion of these tribal groups to the Ibadite doctrine.

== Early Ibadi influence ==
The details of Abd al-Rahman ibn Rustam's time in al-Qayrawan and his first connection to Ibadism remain unknown. It was around the time he reached an age where he could express his own views that his interest in Ibadism emerged. Various historical accounts provide different explanations of how he adopted this doctrine and then traveled to al-Basrah to learn under the Ibadi scholar Abu Ubayda Muslim. One early account, provided by Abu Zakariyya al-Warjlani (d. 1078), states that a man from the Ibadis, recognizing Abd al-Rahman's interest in Ibadism, advised him to travel to al-Basrah (in today's Iraq) and meet Abu Ubayda Muslim, where he would find the knowledge he was seeking. This version is also echoed by the later Ibadite author Ahmd al-Darjini (d. 1270).

Ahmad al-Shammakhi (d. 1552) presents an alternative version of the story, he recounts that when Salama ibn Sa’d arrived in the Maghreb to preach Ibadism and settled in Al-Qayrawan, Abd al-Rahman is said to have heard him remark, "I wish that this thing [Ibadism] would be recognized for even just one day, and I wouldn't mind if my neck were struck". These words are believed to have deeply impacted Abd al-Rahman, sparking his desire to further explore the doctrine. In line with Abu Zakariyya al-Warjlani, al-Shammakhi also mentions that an Ibadite man advised Abd al-Rahman to travel to al-Basrah. However, al-Shammakhi adds another supposition: it may have actually been Abd al-Rahman's mother who advised him to undertake the journey. Contemporary scholar al-Rashidi casts doubt on al-Shammakhi's account, questioning whether Abd al-Rahman was actually in Al-Qayrawan when Salama ibn Sa’d preached, and whether he truly heard those words. Despite these differing accounts, what is agreed upon across the sources is that Abd al-Rahman traveled to al-Basrah, where he studied under the Ibadi scholar Abu Ubayda Muslim.

== Religious formation ==
Abd al-Rahman ibn Rustam traveled to al-Basrah as part of a group of five students from the Maghreb, to seek religious education in the emerging Ibadi doctrine. Their teacher was Abu Ubayda Muslim, a prominent disciple of Jabir ibn Zayd and later head of the Ibadi community in al-Basrah, following his release from imprisonment under the Umayyad governor al-Hajjaj ibn Yusuf, who died in 714. At the time, the city had emerged as a key center of Ibadi scholarship. Arabic sources refer to this group as the Hamalat al-ʿIlm (Bearers of knowledge). The exact date of their journey and the route they followed are not recorded in the historical sources. However, Maqrin al-Baghturi (fl. 1203) explains that they initially gathered in Mecca (in today's Saudi Arabia) before continuing on to al-Basrah. Scholarly estimates place their journey between 744 and 752.

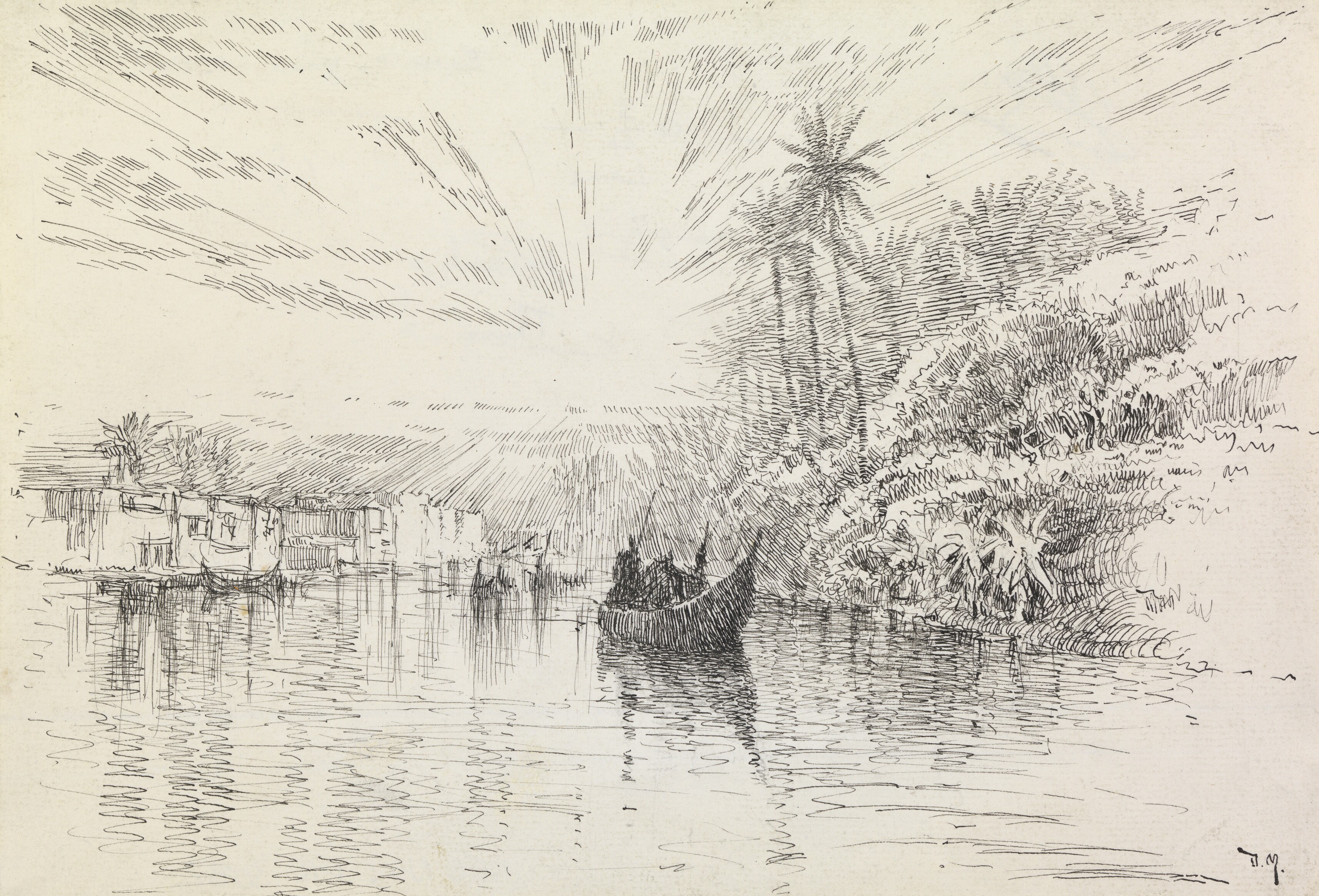
A drawing by Donald Maxwell showing the Tigris River at al-Basrah, the city where Abd al-Rahman ibn Rustum would study under the Ibadi scholar Abu Ubayda Muslim

Given the political persecution of Kharijites at the time, Abu Ubayda Muslim is said to have instructed his students in discreet and secure settings. He became known as al-Qaffaf (the basket-weaver), as he reportedly masked his clandestine lessons by feigning the craft of making handwoven baskets (quffa), with his students similarly pretending to learn the trade to conceal their true purpose. The group was later joined, or possibly accompanied from the beginning, by Abu al-Khattab al-Ma'afiri, who would go on to become the first Ibadi imam (ruler) in the Maghreb. Ibadi historiography portrays Abd al-Rahman ibn Rustam during this formative period as exceptionally handsome—so much so that, according to tradition, Abu Ubayda Muslim placed a veil between him and the others so that his beauty would not distract them. Cyrille Aillet interprets this legendary account as involving a veil of modesty, intended to safeguard the young man's virtue. He sees it as an example of how legendary or anecdotal narratives reflect the collective political imagination, shaped by the shared symbolic repertoire of Islam.

They remained in al-Basrah for several years. Ahmad al-Shammakhi specifies the duration as five years, though the modern scholar al-Rashidi questions whether this was sufficient for attaining a deep mastery of Ibadi teachings. Before leaving, they sought the guidance of Abu Ubayda Muslim regarding what they should do if they became strong enough to appoint a leader. Abu Ubayda instructed them to select one among themselves to lead and to kill him if he refused the responsibility. He then pointed to Abu al-Khattab al-Maʿafiri.

== Conquests ==
The first Imam of the Ibadites had captured Kairouan from the Warfadjuma warriors and after his conquest, he gave several parts of Ifriqiya (central North Africa) to Abd al-Rahman (in June 758—the same year—Ibn al-Asha'ath retook Kairawan). Ibn al-Ash'ath was after him though.

Quickly though, Abd Al-Rahman and his son Abd al-Wahhab and their companions took refuge in the central Maghrib and ended up founding the town of Tahert, which is now known as Tagdemt near Kuzul. The city was quickly populated with Ibadite emigrants from Ifriqiya and Jabal Nafusa.

At about 776 or 778 CE, Abd Al-Rahman became the Imam of the Ibadites of Tahert. He seems to have had a very peaceful reign and worked hard to ensure that justice and simplicity were also instilled in Tahert's legal system. The eastern Abadite communities held high respect for him and sent him a number of money and presents, in addition to recognizing his right to an Imamate. He is alleged to have died at about 784 CE and his son Abd Al-Wahhab succeeded him.

== Death and succession ==
The death of Abd al-Rahman is currently only reported by the late Maghrebi scholar Ibn 'Idhari al-Marrakushi in his work Al-Bayan al-Mughrib (c. 1312 CE). Ibn 'Idhari records the date of his death as 168 AH (784–785 CE). This account likely derives from the lost chronicles of Ibn al-Warraq (10th century CE).

According to Ibadi historiography (al-Warjlani, al-Shammakhi), Abd al-Rahman ibn Rustum, anticipating his death, established a consultative council (shura) to elect the next imam. While sources vary, citing six, seven, or eight members, the procedure was explicitly modeled after the precedent of the second Rashidun caliph, Umar ibn al-Khattab, who had appointed a council to determine his successor.

The council included Abd al-Rahman's son, Abd al-Wahhab, and Yazid ibn Fandin, the future leader of the Nukkari opposition. After a month of deliberation, the council favored Masud al-Andalusi. Despite his reputation for piety and knowledge, Masud fled and hid to avoid the investiture. The community then turned to Abd al-Wahhab, who held strong support from the Zenata through his mother's Banu Ifran lineage. Once the selection was finalized, Masud returned to publicly pledge his support.

Historian Ibrahim ibn Bakir Bahaz challenges this narrative, arguing the parallel to Umar ibn al-Khattab is likely unreliable. He contends that the subsequent Nukkariyya schism further undermines the council's legitimacy. Additionally, the 9th-10th century chronicler Ibn al-Saghir omits the council entirely, reporting instead that Abd al-Rahman directly designated his son.
