= Ibadism in the Maghreb =

Islamic history of the Maghreb

The arrival and establishment of Ibadism in the Maghreb dates back to the early Islamic history of the region. This madhhab, which originated in the Arabian Peninsula and Basra, its early intellectual and doctrinal center, faced sustained Umayyad persecution, particularly against its activists and scholars. This forced many Ibadis to seek refuge far from the caliphate's political centers, where they could spread their Islamic school of thoughts, which later found fertile ground in the Maghreb.

== History ==
Historical settlements of the Ibadi community in the Maghreb region.

Historical sources do not specify the exact moment when Ibadism first took root in the Maghreb, but its emergence there is closely linked to the oppressive policies of the Umayyad governors. These officials, imposed heavy taxes and subjected the local populations to harsh treatment, which not only fueled widespread resentment but also sparked the Berber Revolt. This environment of resistance, coupled with the Berbers' rejection of the hereditary caliphal system, created a fertile ground for the spread of other islamic doctrines. The Ibadis, themselves persecuted in the Mashriq (the Islamic East) by the Umayyads, were actively searching for regions beyond the caliphate's direct control where their religious movement could safely grow. The Maghreb, with its vast territories and its many tribes, became the ideal refuge for the Ibadis to settle, organize, and establish their madhhab far from the centers of Umayyad power.

By the early 8th century, following the persecution by the Umayyad governor Al-Hajjaj ibn Yusuf (r. 694–714), the Kharijites made their way into North Africa. The Maghreb became a destination for these early waves of Kharijite settlers. Historical sources tell us that Salama ibn Sa’d and Ikrima ibn Abd Allah arrived together during this period, with Salama Preaching Ibadism and Ikrima advocating for Sufrism. These two figures are frequently portrayed as the pioneering representatives of Ibadism and Sufrism in North Africa.

== See also ==
- Rustumid dynasty
- M'zab
- Djerba
