= Abd Allah ibn Yazid al-Fazari =

8th-century Islamic scholar

- عبدالله بن يزيد الفزاري
- Born: c. 748; Kufa
- Died: c. 795
- Occupation: Theologist

Academic background
- Influences: Abu Ubayda Muslim ibn Abi Karima, Jabir ibn Zayd

Academic work
- Era: Abbāsid
- School or tradition: Ibadi
- Main interests: theology
- Notable works: Kitab al-Qadr (كتاب القدر); ‘Book of Predetermination’

Abū Muḥammad ʿAbdallāh ibn Yazīd al-Fazārī (Arabic: أبومحمد عبدالله بن يزيد الفزاري) (c. 748–795), was an Ibadi scholar of theology hailing from the Arab tribe of Banu Fazara. His works comprise the earliest extant body of Islamic theology and considered by scholars as an important source for studying the first development of rational theology in Islam.

== Biography ==
Abd Allah was born to a family of the Banu Fazara tribe in the city of Kufa, at the time a flourishing city under the rule of the Abbasid Caliphate. Abd Allah is known to have been a silk trader in Kufa. He most probably travelled to pursue his studies of theology in the Ibadi sect in the port city of Basra. Abd Allah most likely took his knowledge in theology under the Ibadite scholar Abu Ubayda Muslim ibn Abi Karima (d. 775). Abu Ubayda played a leading role among the growing Ibadi community in Basra. Abd Allah consider Abu Ubayda as the second spiritual leader of the early Ibadi sect, only after the Imam Jabir ibn Zayd al-Azdi (d. 712) one of the founding figures of the Ibadis. Abd Allah had many followers in the North African Ibadi community later known as the Nukkar, one of the main Ibadi branches. A collection of six texts in theology dating to the 8th century attributed to Abd Allah was recently discovered in the majority Ibadi region of Mzab in Algeria. In these manuscripts, the sophisticated treatment of the divine related attributes show that this subject has been greatly in constant development even earlier in Islamic theology contrary to what had been formerly proposed by modern scholars.

== Works ==
There are six works attributed to Abd Allah al-Fazari:

- Kitab al-Qadr (Arabic: كتاب القدر, Book of Predetermination)
- Kitab fi al-Rad 'ala Ibn 'Umayr (كتاب في الرد على ابن عمير, Book on Refutation of Ibn ʿUmayr)
- Kitab fi al-Rad 'ala al-Mujassima (كتاب الرد على المجسمة, Book of Refutation of the Corporalists)
- Kitab al-Fatya (كتاب الفتيا, Book of Legal Opinion)
- Kitab al-Tawhid fi Ma'rifat Allah (كتاب التوحيد في معرفة الله, Book of Monotheism in the Recognition of God)
- Kitab fi man Raja' 'an 'Elmeh wa Faraq al-Nabi wa Huwa 'ala Deneh (كتاب في من رجع عن علمه وفارق النبيّ وهو على دينه, Book about Whoever Reneges on his Knowledge and Departs from the Prophet while Remaining in his Religion)

== See also ==
- List of pre-modern Arab scientists and scholars
