= Tajdit Mosque =

Mosque in Djerba, Tunisia

- Arabic: مسجد تاجديت
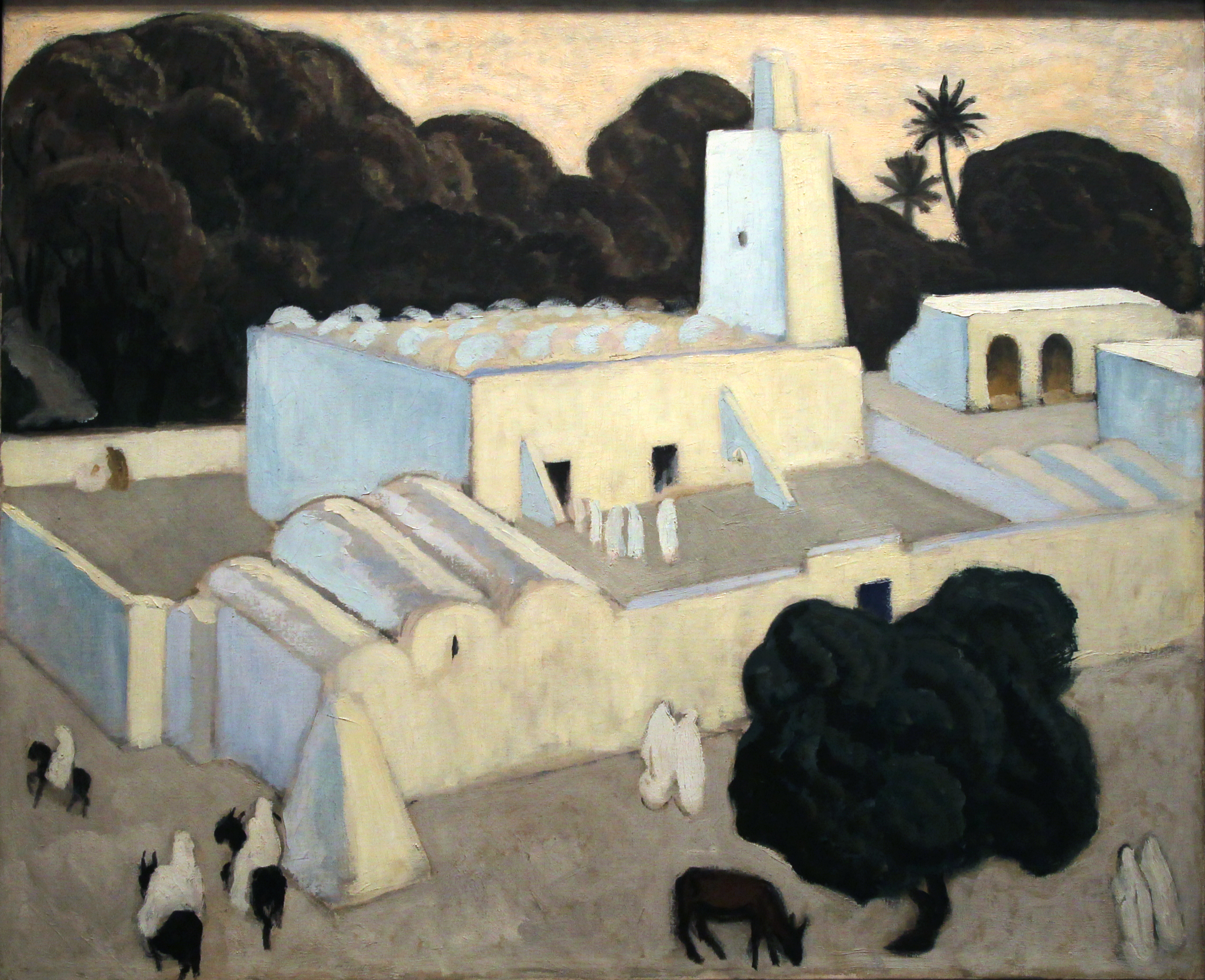

- Location in Tunisia

Religion
- Affiliation: Islam
- Branch/tradition: Ibadi
- Ecclesiastical or organizational status: Mosque
- Status: Active

Location
- Location: Djerba
- Country: Tunisia
- Interactive map of Tajdit Mosque

Architecture
- Founder: Abd al-Wahhab ibn Abd al-Rahman; Aflah Ibn Abd Al-Wahhab
- Completed: Late 9th century

Specifications
- Length: 11 m (36 ft)
- Width: 11 m (36 ft)
- Interior area: 2,534 m^{2} (27,280 sq ft)
- Minaret: One
- Site area: 4,700 m^{2} (51,000 sq ft)
- UNESCO World Heritage Site
- Type: Cultural
- Criteria: v
- Designated: 2023
- Parent listing: Djerba: Testimony to a settlement pattern in an island territory
- Reference no.: 1640-010

The Tajdit Mosque (Arabic: مسجد تاجديت) is an Ibadi mosque situated in Djerba, Tunisia. It is presumed that it was built during the late reign of Abd al-Wahhab ibn Abd al-Rahman, the second Rustumid Imam, with the assistance of his governor in Djerba. However, no evidence has been found to confirm that it was constructed by the Rustumids.

== Etymology ==
The word "tajdit" means "new" in Berber, meaning it is likely its name translates to the "New Mosque".

== History ==
It is presumed that themosque was ordered by second Rustamid Imam, Abd al-Wahhab ibn Abd al-Rahman, and was estimated to have started construction in the beginning of the 3rd century Hijri, which translates to the 800s, during his late reign years. It is located in the countryside of Djerba. Its Mihrab was built by Abu Messeouar Fecil. Salem Ben Yagoub confirms that Tajdit was built on the orders of the Rustamid State. According to Ben Yagoub, the madrasa developed as soon as the mosque was created, and there used to be structures around the place of worship to accommodate lessons, students, and teachers, as evidenced by mounds of earth still around the area. Ben Yagoub also estimates that the mosque was fully constructed in the end of the 3rd century Hijri, during the rule of Aflah.As far as the 870s. According to R. Mrabet, the study of the building establishes that it underwent a significant modification in a distant era; the prayer hall was then much smaller than it is today, and the north arcade, which still bears traces of decoration, would belong to this original core. Referring to the fact that local oral tradition associates the mosque with the ninth century. Many reconstructions occurred during the next few centuries, we know this due to changes in size, Tajdit had some cheikhs whose names were preserved, Yusuf al-Ibadi who died in the beginning of the 6th century Hijri (12th century CE), and two other sheikhs during the 7th century Hijri (13th century CE).

== Architecture ==
The mosque site spans 4,700 m^{2} (51,000 sq ft), with a built area of 2,534 m^{2} (27,280 sq ft). Its prayer hall, at the center of the mosque, stands on a square plan measuring 11 m (36 ft) on each side. Surrounded by an open courtyard and various annexes, the mosque boasts massive white walls and sturdy protruding buttresses, evoking the appearance of a fortress. Adding to its defensive features, the mosque's 1.5 m (4 ft 11 in)-high enclosure is pierced with loopholes. A square minaret, situated in the northeast corner of the prayer hall, is crowned with a lantern in the shape of a small bulbous dome, it also houses a Quranic school. It was the front image of a poster when UNESCO announced Djerba as a World Heritage Site in 2023.

== See also ==
- Islam in Tunisia
- List of mosques in Tunisia
