= Rustamid succession crisis =

Succession crisis among the Rustamids

The Rustamid succession crisis occurred during the reign of Abu Bakr ibn Aflah when he became fourth imam of the Rustamids after his father Aflah died. His older brother Abu Yaqzan went to do a Muslim pilgrimage, but then was arrested and imprisoned by the Abbasids. Abu Bakr ibn Aflah fearing the loss of his title to his older brother, attempted to assassinate him.

== Background ==
Abu El Yaqzan ibn Aflah embarked on a pilgrimage to Mecca within Abbasid territory. However, when authorities discovered his relation to a rival dynasty, he was arrested in early 872. While in Tahert, Aflah died, thereby effectively installing Abu Bakr as the new imam, as he was the sole available successor at the time.

== Crisis ==
Upon Abu Al Yaqzan's return in 873, Abu Bakr, fearing political pressure and the potential loss of his imam title, attempted to assassinate his older brother, a scandalous breach of Ibadite ethics. However, his attempt failed, plunging the Rustamids into chaos as divisions worsened. This sparked a full-blown civil war between the supporters of Abu Bakr and Abu Al Yaqzan, with factions from Tahert, Lawata, and Djebel Nafusa taking sides. Eventually, the people rallied behind Abu Al Yaqzan, electing him as imam and forcing Abu Bakr to step down. Before he could do so willingly in 874, Abu Al Yaqzan seized power, effectively ending Abu Bakr's reign by his demise and assuming the position of the fifth imam of the Rustamids.

== Aftermath ==
Following the resolution of the crisis, Abu Yaqzan ascended to become the fifth imam of the Rustamids, holding sway for a span of two decades, from 874 to 894, then being succeeded by his son.

== See also ==
- Rustamid dynasty
- Aflah Ibn Abd al-Wahhab
- Abu Bakr ibn Aflah
