= Tripoli Campaign =

Tripoli Campaign may refer to:

- Barbary Wars, in which the US, Sweden and Sicily fought against Tripoli, Algiers, Tunis and Morocco
- Italo-Turkish War#Opening maneuver, in which Italy captured Tripoli and the Tripolitania Villayet from the Ottoman Empire
- Fighting in and around Tripoli during the Second Libyan Civil War

== See also ==
- Siege of Tripoli (disambiguation)
- List of wars involving Libya
- List of wars involving Lebanon
