= Ziaka Angeliki =

Greek academic

Ziaka Angeliki is an academic scholar on Islamic studies expertise on Byzantine studies, Ibadi Studies and Shia Studies.

== Studies ==
Angeliki Ziaka was born in Thessaloniki and studied at the School of Theology of Aristotle University of Thessaloniki. She took her PhD from the Marc Bloch University of Strasbourg University of Strasbourg in 2002 with title La Recherche Grecque contemporaine et l’Islam. Angeliki Ziaka, also studied at the Institute of Arabic and Islamic Studies in Rome, the History Department of the Royal University of Amman, and she has conducted research in Iran and Oman since 2006.Her interests include early and medieval Islamic historiography and Kalam; Byzantine and post-Byzantine literature on Islam; religious historical narratives and the re-articulating of Muslim identities through religious discourse and political realities in the Middle East, inter-religious dialogue and Religious Education in religious and secular environments and institutions.

== Career ==
Angeliki Ziaka is a Greek Associate Professor of Religion, at Theology School and the Scientific Head of the new Undergraduate Program on Islamic Studies at the School of Theology of Aristotle University of Thessaloniki. Also, Angeliki Ziaka was visiting Professor at the Schools of Political Science and Education of Aristotle University of Thessaloniki. Dr. Angeliki Ziaka was a Leiden University Centre for the Study of Islam and Society Fellow in 2014 and a Middle East Institute at Columbia University Fellow in New York in 2017. She is a member of the Greek Delegation to the International Holocaust Remembrance Alliance. Angeliki Ziaka belongs to the Scientific Committee of International Conference on Ibāḍī Studies.

== Main works ==
- Ziaka, Angeliki, La Recherche Grecque contemporaine et l’Islam (Strasbourg 2002/Lille, 2004).
- Ziaka, Angeliki, Shia Islam. Social and Political Dimensions in the Middle East (Thessaloniki, 2004, in Greek).
- Ziaka, Angeliki, Between Polemics and Dialogue: Byzantine, Post Byzantine and Contemporary Greek Literature on Islam (Thessaloniki 2010, in Greek).
- Ziaka, Angeliki, Dialogue: The Meeting of Christianity with Islam (Thessaloniki 2010, in Greek).
- Ziaka, Angeliki, Early Islamic Apocalyptic and Messianic Movements: Mahdi the Eschatological Savior (Thessaloniki 2011, in Greek).
- Ziaka, Angeliki, Οn Ibadism (Hildesheim/N.Y., 2014).
- Ziaka, Angeliki, Kalam and the Islamic Trends of Thought (Thessaloniki 2016, in Greek).

== Papers and lecturers related to Ibadism ==
- Ziaka, Angeliki: (2013) The South East European view [on Oman and Ibadism]. In: Hoffmann-Ruf and al-Salimi (eds.) 2013a, 481-491.*
- Ziaka, Angeliki: (2013) The roots of the Uṣūl al-Fiqh in the Ibāḍī Madhhab. A comparison between Abū Saʿīd al-Kudami and Ibn Baraka. A lecture delivered at: International conference: Ibāḍī Jurisprudence. Ibāḍī law in the post-Rustamid period.
- Ziaka, Angeliki: (2014) [A series of lectures for Leiden University Centre of Islamic Studies (LUCIS), 3, 7, 24, 28 Nov. 2014].
- Ziaka, Angeliki: (2014) Early Ibāḍī theological works as historical sources. A lecture delivered at: International Conference: today's perspectives on Ibāḍī history and the historical sources
- Ziaka, Angeliki: (2015) Redefining Ibadi identity through religious discourse in the time of the Nahḍa. A lecture delivered at: International conference: Sixth conference on Ibadism and Oman.
