= Abu al-Khattab al-Ma'afiri =

Yameni Ibadi Muslim

- ابو الخطاب المعافري
- Died: c. 761
- Arabic name
- Personal (Ism): Abd al-A'la عبد الأعلى
- Patronymic (Nasab): ibn al-Samh ibn Ubayd ابن السمح ابن عبيد
- Teknonymic (Kunya): Abu al-Khattab أبو الخطاب
- Toponymic (Nisba): al-Ma'afiri al-Himyari al-Yemeni المعافري الحميري اليمني

Abu al-Khattab al-Ma'afiri (Arabic: ابو الخطاب المعافري) was an Yameni Ibadi Muslim scholar and the first Imam of ibadis in Djbel Nafusa.

== Life ==
His full name is Abd al-A'la ibn al-Samh ibn Ubayd al-Ma'afiri al-Himyari al-Yemeni. His birth date is unknown.

He learned Ibadite principles from his teacher, Abu Ubayda Muslim ibn Abi Karima, in Basra (in present-day Iraq).

== See also ==
- Abbasid conquest of Ifriqiya
- Abu Ubayda Muslim ibn Abi Karima
- Abd al-Rahman ibn Rustam
