= Ibrahim ibn Bakir Bahaz =

Algerian historian

- Born: August 17, 1956 (age 68); Ghardaia
- Citizenship: Algeria
- Arabic name
- Personal (Ism): إبراهيم
- Patronymic (Nasab): Ibrahim ابن بكير بحاز
- Teknonymic (Kunya): Ibn Bakir Bahaz

Ibrahim ibn Bakir Bahaz or Brahim Bahaz (Arabic: ابراهيم ابن بكير بحاز; 17 August 1956) is an Algerian Ibadi scholar, historian, and manuscriptologist.

== Life ==
Ibrahim Bahaz was born on 17 August 1956 in the village of Tazuzout, in the Ghardaïa oasis of Algeria, during French colonial rule. His father, was engaged in commerce and was residing in El Khroub at the time. His mother, was his father’s cousin. He began his studies at the mosque, where he learned the Quran, while also attending a primary school taught by both French and Arab teachers. He continued his studies at Imam Abdelhamid Ben Badis middle school, now known as Imam Ali Ibn Abi Talib. After two years, he moved to El Khroub, where he pursued his middle school education for another two years. He later transferred to Constantine, where he completed the final stage of his middle school studies in 1972. He then attended Ridha Houhou High School in Constantine, where he spent three years completing his secondary education. During this period, he developed a particular interest in Arabic literature and history. He got his baccalaureate degree in 1977.

Ibrahim Bahaz studied at Constantine 1 University, where he specialized in history. After completing his license degree, he sought a scholarship to pursue his master’s abroad. In the meantime, he was offered a teaching position at a middle school in Biskra. Shortly after, he was awarded a scholarship to Iraq. Torn between his responsibilities since he was married with children and needed financial stability, he hesitated. His father, however, encouraged him to continue his studies and promised to support him financially during that time.

In 1980, after some hesitation due to the Iran–Iraq War, he traveled to Iraq to pursue his scholarship. However, upon arrival, he found the borders closed. He then went to Syria, met some of his friends, and stayed there for a month hoping the borders would reopen, but when they didn’t, he flew back to Algeria.

== Works ==
Brahim Bahaz collaborated with his colleague Muhammed Nasir to produce a new edited Arabic edition of Ibn al-Saghir's book, which was first published in 1986.

=== Selected articles ===
- Bahaz, Ibrahim (2018-09-24), "11. Réflexions sur la nature du pouvoir rustumide", L’ibadisme dans les sociétés de l’Islam médiéval (in French), De Gruyter, pp. 127–136

== See also ==
- Ibadi studies
