= Abdallah ibn Ibad =

Arab Islamic scholar and Kharijite from Basra (died c. 700)

Abd Allah ibn Ibad al-Tamimi (Arabic: عبدالله بن إباض التميمي, romanized: ʿAbd Allāh ibn Ibāḍ al-Tamīmī; died c. 700) was an Arab Islamic scholar and a leader of the Kharijites from Basra, of the tribe of Banū Saʿd of Tamīm. In traditional Islamic historiography, he is the founder and eponym of Ibāḍīsm.

Ibn Ibāḍ was one of the group of Basran Kharijites who, led by Nāfīʿ ibn al-Azraq, joined the defenders under ʿAbd Allāh ibn al-Zubayr at the siege of the Kaʿba by the Umayyads in 683. After the siege was lifted, the Kharijites were disappointed by Ibn al-Zubayr's refusal to denounce the late Caliph ʿUthmān and returned to Basra. There they were imprisoned by the Umayyad governor ʿUbayd Allāh ibn Ziyād. When the Basrans rose up and overthrew Umayyad rule, the prisoners were freed. Ibn al-Azraq led many of them to Ahvaz, denouncing the townsmen as "polytheists". Ibn Ibāḍ remained in Basra. His father, Ibāḍ ibn ʿAmr al-Tamīmī, seems to have been the first leader of the moderates who refused to secede with Ibn al-Azraq.

Ibn Ibāḍ succeeded his father and wrote a defence of those Kharijites who stayed behind. By defending the Basrans against the charge of polytheism and accusing them of no more than "ingratitude", he justified the decision of true Muslims to live among them. According to Abū Mikhnaf, who died in 774 and is the earliest source on Ibn Ibāḍ's life, Ibn Ibāḍ also wrote against the intermediate position of ʿAbd Allāh ibn al-Ṣaffār, founder of the Sufri sect. According to al-Madāʾinī, Ibn Ibāḍ also received opposition from Abū Bayhas, founder of the Bayhasiyya sect, who took a position closer to Ibn al-Azraq's.

The dispute over Ibn al-Azraq's hijra to Ahvaz is the last known event in Ibn Ibāḍ's life. Ibāḍī tradition itself contains no further biographical details. It does ascribe to Ibn Ibāḍ two surviving letters addressed to the Umayyad caliph ʿAbd al-Malik. Recent scholarship has questioned their authenticity. Even Ibn Ibāḍ's position as the leader of the first Ibāḍīs has come into question. His contemporary, Jābir ibn Zayd (died 712), is given even greater prominence in later tradition. One of the letters ascribed to Ibn Ibāḍ has been reassigned to Jābir ibn Zayd and its recipient identified as ʿAbd al-Malik ibn al-Muhallab, head of the Azd tribe to which Jābir belonged.

== See also ==
- Jabir ibn Zayd
- Abu Ubayda Muslim ibn Abi Karima
- Salama ibn Sa'd
