= Enrico Insabato =

Italian orientalist and scholar of Islam

Enrico Insabato (born 1878 in Bologna and died in 1963) was an Italian orientalist and scholar of Islam. Some of his works are related with the history of research on Ibadism.

== Works related to Ibadism ==
- Insabato, E.: (1918) Gli Abaditi del Gebel Nefusa a la politica islamica in Tripolitania. Rome 1918. Istituto Coloniale Italiano. Sezione Studi e Propaganda. Memorie e Monografie Coloniali. Serie Islamica-1.
- Insabato, Enrico: (1920) L'Islam et la politique des alliés. L'Islam mystique et schismatique. Le problème du Khalifat. Adapté de l'Italien par Magali-Boisnard. Nancey/Paris/Strasbourg: Berger- Levrault, 1920.
