= Siege of Tripoli (disambiguation) =

The Siege of Tripoli (1102–1109) took place in the aftermath of the First Crusade and led to the establishment of the fourth crusader state, the County of Tripoli, in Lebanon.

Siege of Tripoli or Battle of Tripoli may also refer to:

== In Tripoli, Lebanon ==
- Siege of Tripoli (1271), siege of the Crusader stronghold, by the Egyptian Mamluks
- Fall of Tripoli (1289), capture of the Crusader territory, by the Mamluks
- Battle of Tripoli (1367) a battle between the Cypriot crusaders and the Mamluks
- Battle of Tripoli (1983), part of the Lebanese Civil War
- 2007 Lebanon conflict, at a Palestinian refugee camp near Tripoli, Lebanon

== In Tripoli, Libya ==
- Siege of Tripoli (812), Rustamid Siege of Tripoli, Libya in 812
- Siege of Tripoli (1551), Ottoman Siege of Tripoli, Libya in 1551 from the Knights of St. John
- Siege of Tripoli (1705), Tunisian Siege of Tripoli, Libya in 1705
- First Barbary War (1801–1805), also known as Tripolitan War
- First Battle of Tripoli Harbor (1802)
- Second Battle of Tripoli Harbor (1804)
- Battle of Tripoli (1825), defeat of Tripolitians by Sardinia
- Battle of Tripoli (1911), of the Italo-Turkish War
- Battle of Tripoli (1943), between the Deutsch-Italienische Korps of Erwin Rommel and the British in the North African campaign
- Tripoli protests and clashes (February 2011), part of the Libyan civil war
- Battle of Tripoli (2011), decisive battle of the Libyan civil war resulting in the capture of Tripoli by Qatari and rebel Libyan forces
- Battle of Tripoli (2018), a series of clashes during the second Libyan civil war
- 2019–20 Western Libya campaign, an offensive involving clashes on the outskirts of Tripoli

== See also ==
- Amr ibn al-As#Expeditions in Cyrenaica and Tripolitania, including a siege of Tripoli, Libya c.643.
