= Abu Zakariyya al-Warjlani =

Ibadi scholar and writer (d. 1078)

- Born: Warglan (in modern-day Algeria)
- Died: 1078 or after 1081
- Notable work: Kitab Siyar al-Aimmah wa Akhbaruhum
- Arabic name
- Personal (Ism): Yahya يحيى
- Teknonymic (Kunya): Abu Zakariyya أبو زكريا
- Toponymic (Nisba): al-Warjlani الوارجلاني

Abu Zakariyya al-Warjlani (Arabic: أبو زكرياء الوارجلاني) was an Ibadi scholar, he is mostly known for his book of biographies Kitab Siyar al-Aimmah wa Akhbaruhum.

== Life ==
Historical sources provide little information about the life of Abu Zakariyya al-Warjlani; most available details come from Ahmad al-Darjini’s account and scattered references in al-Warjlani’s own writings. Sources report his full name as Abu Zakariyya Yahya ibn Abi Bakr ibn Said al-Yahrasni al-Warjlani. His nisba, al-Yahrasni (or al-Yarasni), connects him to the Berber tribe of Banu Yahrasn, whose territory historically extended from the Djerba in present-day Tunisia to the Nafusa Mountains in Libya and the Djerid region of Tunisia. He was likely born in Warglan, in what is now Algeria, suggesting that his family may have settled there following an earlier migration.

Abu Zakariyya al-Warjlani earned his livelihood through farming and was not settled in Warglan, but he occasionally returned to maintain ties with his community.

== Works ==
His principal work is Kitab Siyar al-Aimmah wa Akhbaruhum, a text that focuses on the biographies of Maghrebi scholars, with particular attention to the history of the Rustumid dynasty and those who succeeded them in guiding the Ibadi community. The text also provides insights into the early phase of the Fatimid dynasty. This chronicle served as a key reference for later Ibadi historians such as al-Darjini and al-Shammakhi, who relied heavily on its material. It is regarded as the earliest surviving Ibadi document concerning the history of the Ibadis in North Africa.Awad Khleifat suggests that Abu Zakariyya may exhibit a bias toward certain ethnic groups, particularly the Persians, to whom the Rustamid family traces its origins.

== See also ==
- Ahmed al-Darjini
- Ahmad ibn Said al-Shammakhi
- Ibn al-Saghir
