= Aflah ibn Abd al-Wahhab =

Rustamid ruler (c. 810 – 872)

Imam of Maghreb al-Awsat
- Reign: 823–872
- Predecessor: Abd al-Wahhab ibn Abd al-Rahman
- Successor: Abu Bakr ibn Aflah
- Born: Before 810; Tiaret, Algeria
- Died: 872; Tiaret, Algeria
- Dynasty: Rustamids
- Father: Abd al-Wahhab ibn Abd al-Rahman
- Religion: Ibadi Islam

Aflah ibn Abd al-Wahhab (Arabic: أفلح بن عبد الوهاب بن عبد الرحمن بن رستم) is the third Imām of the Ibadi dynasty of the Rustamids in central Maghreb. His exceptionally long reign (823–872) is regarded as the golden age of the Imāmat. However, it was primarily characterized by the Mu'tazilite movement.

== Life ==
Aflah ibn Abd al-Wahhāb is the third Imām (823–872) of the Ibadi dynasty of the Rustamids. This dynasty was founded by his grandfather, Ibn Rustam, in Tahert, During Aflah's time, Ibadi Islam still enjoyed considerable popularity in central Maghreb, southern Ifriqiya, and Tripolitania. The Imāmat, of which he was the leader, stood as one of the most influential powers in North Africa, Under his rule, the city of Tahert became a thriving center for the slave trade, facilitated by its privileged connections with the Mediterranean, the East, and the trade routes of the Sahara.

Aflah made significant contributions to improving agricultural infrastructure by constructing farm buildings and expanding irrigation systems extensively. Aflah's exceptionally long reign is considered the golden age of the Rustamid Imāmat. Despite disturbances in the eastern province of the kingdom, his rule remained relatively peaceful. Through flexible diplomacy and generosity, he successfully asserted authority over the nomadic tribes in the region, consolidating his power, During that time, relations with the Umayyads of Cordoba were also favorable. In 853, upon his ascension to the throne, Emir Muhammad I sent a lavish gift to Imām Aflah. under Aflah, the Rustamids even had an embassy all the way to Sudan, the state Aflah had an embassy with is still unknown, but it was probably a state called 'Gao'. Aflah continued the building of the 'Tajdit Mosque' or the 'New Mosque' in Berber, located in Djerba, this mosque was first ordered by his father Abd Al Wahhab, and his representant/Amil in Djerba, before his death in 823. According to S. Ibn Yaqub, dates its construction to the end of the 9th century, because the two mosques in the region, Tagūmīn and Täwarghit, the latter of which has disappeared, were no longer sufficient to accommodate the population, and he confirms that Täjdīt was indeed built at the behest of the Rustamid State. According to him, the madrasa developed as soon as the mosque was created, and there used to be structures around the place of worship to accommodate lessons and to house students and professors, which would still be evidenced by mounds of earth around the area.

== Politics ==
Aflah faced growing opposition, a combination of tribal conflicts and anti-authoritarian Kharijite tendencies, According to later tradition, Aflah was depicted as a defender of orthodoxy, having fought against Yazid b. Fandin, the leader of the Nekkarites, as well as the Mu'tazilites. He is said to have written epistles against the Nafathiyya, a recently formed schismatic movement led by Farj b. Na'r.

Aflah's reign was primarily marked by the Mu'tazilite movement. He faced the repercussions of its rise and triumph, as well as its subsequent decline. In his youth, Aflah witnessed the controversies his father, Abd al-Wahhab, had to confront against the Mu'tazilites. As an adult, he led a violent crackdown against them. Later on, Aflah reintegrated the Mu'tazilites into the community of Tahert and became the Imam of the Ibadi-Sufri-Waçili faction (Mu'tazilites). They gained significant influence, being part of his inner circle and even entrusted with his protection. They were nomads residing in the vicinity of Tahert.

The division in the Djebel Nefoussa came to an end with a decisive defeat inflicted upon Kh̲alaf in 836. This movement, stemming from the second split under Imam Abd al-Wahhab, then lost much of its prestige.

The power of Imam Aflah raised such concern among the Abbasids that he was accused of conspiring against their dynasty and preparing to seize power in Baghdad. His son, Abu-l-Yaqdan, who allegedly gathered Kharijite leaders from the East in Mecca during his pilgrimage, was captured there and later transferred to and imprisoned in Baghdad until the death of Al-Mutawakkil.

This marked the beginning of a new era. Qadi Sahnun expelled the Kharijites from his mosque in Kairouan, while Imam Aflah ordered the burning and razed an entire city named Al 'Abbasiyya by the Aghlabids in 853.

Aflah extended his trade as far as Niger, Mali, and Chad, while also converting the whole maghreb to his doctrine

After Aflah's death, the internal history of the Rustamid kingdom became tumultuous. His succession by his younger son, Abū Bakr, after the Abbasids captured his designated heir, Abū al-Yaqẓān, quickly led to a political crisis.

== Ibadite Works ==
Aflah al-Wahhāb was also involved in the transfer of knowledge from the East. He had the opportunity to meet Abū Ghānim al-Khurāsānī, the author of the first known Ibadi canonical compilation called Mudawwana. Aflah studied the writings of Abū Sufyān and transmitted the traditions of the Prophet's early companions. In line with the Rustamids' reputation as the "house of knowledge" (bayt al-ʿilm), Aflah al-Wahhāb was considered a mufti and theologian, even gathering three study circles (halaqa) around him before reaching puberty. Little is known with certainty about Aflah's own writings. He is credited with a short didactic poem celebrating the pursuit of religious knowledge, titled "Qaṣīda fī faḍl al-ʿilm wa-l-mutaʿallim", but it is never mentioned in medieval literature. On the other hand, his unpublished Jawābāt ("Answers") are mentioned, but only from the 14th century onwards. Some manuscripts indicate that these responses were intended for one or more specific interlocutors, although their identity has not been established. Most manuscripts contain only a selection of legal material, likely extracted from longer versions of the Jawābāt.

Knowledge is purer for the people of knowledge; now they present their souls to you. Endure the harshness of separation from those chosen souls, understanding that in people lies the secret. Be patient amidst the vicissitudes, as one who knows the value of pearls. The chosen ones among the scholars are favored by God, for in their humility lies greatness. They fast during the day and live the night, traveling to meet noble men. Be kind, for you are derived from knowledge. Whether alive or dead, a person with knowledge and goodwill never truly dies; their influence surpasses. Knowledge has a virtue of its own, surpassing all actions. A seeker of knowledge spends his nights engaged, and a worshipper dedicates a year to God diligently. Embark on the journey of knowledge over any other journey. Reach the expanses of knowledge through various travels. The tasks of the earth are treasures and lessons for those who appreciate. Show kindness to the people of knowledge and renew their respect daily. Do not hoard newspapers like the ignorant; carry your dignity between loads. Virtue is a great treasure; cultivate it for yourself today, and it will leave lasting effects. The best of people are the servants of God; indeed, they have a special status.

— Aflah ibn Abd Al-Wahhāb ibn Abd Al Rahman,

== See also ==
- Abu Sahl al-Farisi al-Nafusi
