= Valerie Hoffman (academic) =

American academic

Valerie Hoffman is an academic scholar on Islamic studies expertise on religion, anthropology of Islam and Ibadi studies.

== Biography ==
Valerie Hoffman is Professor and Head of the Department of Religion at the University of Illinois at Urbana-Champaign and specialises in Islamic thought and practice. She received her BA in Anthropology from the University of Pennsylvania and her MA and PhD in Near Eastern Languages and Civilisations from the University of Chicago. She has a broad range of research interests, including classical Islamic theology, Islamic philosophy, Sufism, gender ideology, Ibadism and modern Islamic thought. She has used diverse methodologies, ranging from anthropological-style fieldwork to the study of manuscripts. She is the author of Sufism, Mystics and Saints in Modern Egypt (University of South Carolina Press, 1995) and The Essentials of Ibāḍī Islam (Syracuse University Press, 2012), and is the editor of Making the New Middle East: Politics, Culture, and Human Rights (Syracuse University Press, 2018). She has also written articles on Sufism, Islamic gender ideology, Ibāḍī Islam, human rights, and contemporary Islamic thought. She was a Fulbright research fellow in Egypt (1987-1988) and in Oman and Yemen (2000-2001) and was a Carnegie scholar in Oman in 2009-2010. She served on the board of directors of the Middle East Studies Association of North America and on the editorial boards of the International Journal of Middle East Studies and the Journal of the American Academy of Religion. Her current book project is Islamic Sectarianism Reconsidered: Ibāḍī Islam in the Modern Age.

== Works ==
- Hoffman, Valerie J.: (1995) Sufism, Mystics and Saints in Modern Egypt. Columbia: SC University of South Carolina, 1995.
- Hoffman, Valerie J.: (2012) The essentials of Ibāḍī Islam (Jawāhir al-ʿAqīda al-Ibāḍiyya). Syracuse (New York): Syracuse University Press, 2012. ISBN 978-0-81563288-7.
