= Siege of Tripoli (812) =

| Date | July 812 |
| Location | Tripoli, Libya |
| Result | Siege lifted: Modus vivendi |

Belligerents
| Rustamids; Nafusa | Aghlabids |

Commanders and leaders
| Abd al-Wahhab ibn Abd al-Rahman | Ibrahim ibn al Aghlab # Abdallah ibn Ibrahim |

The siege of Tripoli (Arabic: حصار طرابلس) was a conflict between the Aghlabids and the Rustamids in July 812.

== Siege ==
Imam Abd al-Wahhāb ibn Abd al-Rahman of the Rustamid dynasty initiated hostilities with the Aghlabids by leading Ibadi Tripolitanian tribes in an assault on Tripoli in July 812.

During the siege, the Aghlabid Emir of Ifriqiya, Ibrahim ibn al-Aghlab passed away. His son, Abdullah ibn Ibrahim, who was commanding the troops besieged in Tripoli, was called upon to assume the role of the new emir, prompting him to leave Tripoli by sea. Consequently, the Ibadis lifted the siege of Tripoli, suggesting that an agreement had been reached. This established a modus vivendi between the two belligerents.

== Aftermath ==
The Ibadi tribes of Tripolitania and southern Tunisia were afterwards left by the Rustamid imams to fend for themselves in their confrontations with the Aghlabids. Ibadi tribes were frustrated with Rustamid military inactivity, causing schismatic secessionist movements to form and outbreak of several rebellions.
