= John C. Wilkinson =

British academic scholar on Islamic studies

- Born: John Craven Wilkinson

Academic background
- Education: University of Oxford

Academic work
- Discipline: Islamic studies
- Sub-discipline: Ibadi studies
- Institutions: University of Oxford

John Craven Wilkinson (born 1934) is a scholar of Islamic studies specializing in Ibadi studies. He is a British expert in the field of Ibadi studies.

== Biography ==
Prior to his career in Islamic studies, he worked for international oil companies throughout the Middle East. He then returned to the UK to obtain his PhD at Oxford, where he wrote his doctoral thesis on the Ibadi Imamate of Oman. In 1969, he finished his PhD thesis titled Arab settlement in Oman: the origins and development of the tribal pattern and its relationship to the Imamate. Wilkinson then began a prolific career publishing on Ibadi Islam and Omani history. From 1969 until his retirement in 1997, Wilkinson taught at Oxford University as a Reader. He is also an Emeritus Fellow of St. Hugh's College in Oxford. He is widely regarded as the world's foremost Western expert on Oman's tribes, demonstrated especially in Water and tribal settlement in South-East Arabia. A study of the Aflāj of Oman in 1977.

== Works ==
- Arab settlement in Oman: the origins and development of the tribal pattern and its relationship to the Imamate. Ph.D. thesis, University of Oxford, 1969.
- A short history of Oman from earliest times. Muscat 1972.
- Water and tribal settlement in South-East Arabia. A study of the Aflāj of Oman. Oxford: Clarendon Press, 1977. [reprinted in 2013, Hildesheim: Georg Olms Verlag]
- (with David L. Harrison): min al-Bī'a al-ʿUmāniyya. Transl. Muḥ. Amīn ʿAbdl. Cairo 1983.
- The Imamate tradition of Oman. Cambridge: Cambridge University Press, 1987.
- Arabia's frontiers: the story of Britain's boundary drawing in the desert. London/New York: Tauris, 1999.
- ʿUmān Tārīkhan wa-ʿUlamā'an. Transl. Muḥ. Amīn ʿAbdl. 3rd impr. Muscat: MNHC, 1994.
- A Fatal Duel: 'Harry Alis' (1857-95), a behind the scenes figure of the early Third Republic. Chippenham: Anthony Rowe, 2006.
- Oman 1965. Muscat: Al Roya Press and Publishing House, 2008.
- Ibāḍism: origins and early development in Oman. Oxford/New York: Oxford University Press, 2010.
- The Arabs and the Scramble for Africa. Bristol, CT: Equinox, 2015.

== Papers related to Ibadism ==
- A sketch of the historical geography of the Trucial Oman down to the beginning of the sixteenth century. Geographical Journal (London), vol. 130 nr. 3 (Sept. 1964), 337-349.
- The Oman question: the background to the political geography of South-east Arabia. Geographical Journal (London), vol. 137, part 3 (1971), 361-371.
- The origins of the Omani state. The Arabian Peninsula: society and politics. Ed. Derek Hopwood. London: George Allen and Unwin Ltd., 1972, 67-88.
- Arab-Persian land relationships in late Sasānid Oman. Proceedings of the Seminar for Arabian Studies (London), 1973, 40-51.
- Bayāsirah and Bayādīr. Arabian Studies (London), vol. 1, 1974, 75-85.
- The organization of the Falaj irrigation system in Oman. Research Paper nr. 10. School of Geography, University of Oxford.
- The Julanda of Oman. Journal of Oman Studies (Muscat, Ministry of Information and Culture), I (1975), 97-108.
- Wilkinson, John C.: (1976a) Bio-bibliographical background to the crisis period in the Ibāḍī Imāmate of Oman. Arabian Studies (London), vol. 3 (1976), 137-164.
- The Ibāḍī imāma. Bulletin of the School of Oriental and African Studies (London), 39 (1976), 535-551.
- Islamic water law with special reference to oasis settlement. Journal of Arid Environments, I (1978), 87-96.
- The Omani manuscript collection at Muscat. Part II: The early Ibāḍī Fiqh works. Arabian Studies (London), vol. 4 (1978), 191-208.
- Sources for the early history of Oman. Studies in the history of Arabia. Vol. 1: Sources for the history of Arabia, part 2, 89-95.
- Ṣuḥār (Sohar) in the early Islamic period: the written evidence. In: Taddei (ed.) 1979, vol. 2, 887-907.
- Nash'at al-Aflāj fī ʿUmān. In: Ḥiṣād Nadwat al-Dirāsāt al-ʿUmāniyya. Muscat: MNHC, 1980, vol. 8.
- Changes in the structure of village life in Oman. In: Niblock (ed.) 1980, 122-134.
- Oman and East Africa: new light on early Kilwan history from the Omani sources. International Journal of African Historical Studies (Boston), vol. 14 (1981) 272-305.
- The early development of the Ibāḍi movement in Basra. In: Juynboll (ed.) 1982, 125-144, notes 241-249.
- Changement et continuité en Oman. In: Bonnenfant, Paul (ed.) 1982, vol. 2, 393-414.
- The origins of the Aflāj of Oman. Journal of Oman Studies (Muscat), vol. 6 part 1 (1983), 177-194.
- Traditional concepts of territory in South-east Arabia. Geographical Journal (London), vol. 149 nr. 3 (1983), 301-315.
- Ibāḍī Ḥadīth: an essay on normalization. Der Islam (Berlin) 62 (1985), 231-259.
- al-Baḥrayn wa-ʿUmān. Al-Wathīqa (Bahrain), 6th year nr. 11 (Dhū 'l-Qaʿda 1407/July 1987), 66-85.
- The Omani and Ibāḍī background to the Kilwah Sīrah; the demise of Oman as a political and religious force in the Indian Ocean in the 6th/12th century. In: Irvine; Serjeant; Smith(eds.) 1988, 131-148.
- Ibāḍī theological literature. In: Young; Latham; Serjeant (eds.) 1990, 33-39.
- Muslim land and water law. Journal of Islamic Studies (Oxford), vol. 1 nr. 1 (1990), 54-72.
- Frontier relationships between Bahrain and Oman. In: Khalifa and Rice (eds.) 1993, 548-566.
- The origins of the Aflāj in Oman. In: Morony (ed.) 2002, 285-302.
- The territorial division of Oman. In: Kapiszewski; al-Salimi; Pikulski (eds.) 2006, 19-61.
- Omani maritime trade in the early Islamic period. In: Proceedings of the International Conference New perspectives in recording UAE history. Abu Dhabi 2009, 145-154.
- The Ibāḍī Imāma. In: Saeed, Abdullah: (ed.) Islamic political thought and governance. London: Routledge, 2010, vol. 2. Reprint from Bulletin of the School of Oriental and African Studies, vol. 39 (1976), 535-551.
- The origins of Omani identity. In: Hoffmann-Ruf and al-Salimi (eds.), Oman and Overseas (Hildesheim: Georg Olms Verlag, 2013), 35-39.*
- Ibadism. Some reconsiderations of its origins and early development. In Ziaka (ed.) 2014a, 43-52.
- On being an Ibāḍī. Muslim World (Hartford), vol. 105 nr. 2 (April 2015), 142-156.
- Moderation and extremism in early Ibāḍī thought. In Francesca (ed.), Ibadi Theology: Rereading Sources and Scholarly Works (Hildesheim: Georg Olms Verlag, 2015), 47-56.
- Contextualizing. The development of Ibāḍī Fiqh. In Michalak-Pikulska and Eisener (eds.) Ibadi Jurisprudence: Origins, Development, and Cases (Hildesheim: Georg Olms Verlag, 2015), 15-23.
- Review of Morton, M.Q., Buraimi: The Struggle for Power, Influence and Oil in Arabia, in J. of Arabian Studies, 4/2 (Dec. 2014), 275-86.
- Ḥamalat al-ʿIlm. In Eisener (ed.) Today's Perspectives on Ibadi History (Hildesheim: Georg Olms Verlag, 2017), 91-97.
- A Historic Perspective on the Nahḍa. In Al-Salimi and Eisener (eds.), Oman, Ibadism and Modernity (Hildesheim: Georg Olms Verlag, 2018), 25-34.
- Ibāḍism and State Formation in Oman. In Al-Salimi and Eisener (eds.), Oman, Ibadism and Modernity (Hildesheim: Georg Olms Verlag, 2018), 163-170.
- (in press) Ibadi Hadith. In The Oxford Handbook of Hadith Studies, ed. Mustrafa Shah.
