= André Nègre =

French diplomat

André Paul Armand Nègre (16 May 1912 - 27 July 1996) was a French diplomat born in Castelmoron-sur-Lot in south-western France.

== Career ==
Nègre entered the Foreign Service and was employed after 1945 in Shanghai, Cairo and Moscow. From the year of 1952 until the year of 1955 he was a Counsellor in Damascus. In 1964 he was a Counsellor and Genera Consul in Tangier. From the year of 1967 until the year of 1970 he was ambassador in Kabul. From 7 January at 1971 to April 30 of 1975, he was an Ambassador Extraordinary and Plenipotentiary in Damascus.

== Publications ==
Nègre published works related to the history of research on Ibāḍī studies.

- (1969) La fin de l'état rustamide. Revue d'Histoire et de Civilisation du Maghreb (Algiers), 6-7 (July 1969), 10–21.
- (1973) A propos d'une expédition fatimide à Wargilan (Ouargla) d'après Abu Zakariyya al-Wargilani. Revue d' Histoire et de Civilisation du Maghreb (Algiers), nr. 10 (Oct. 1973), 37–39.
