= Battle of Tahert =

Date	790
Location	Tahert
Result	Rustamid victory

Belligerents
Idrisid dynasty	Rustamid Imamate

Commanders and leaders
Idris I	Abd al-Wahhab

The Battle of Tahert occurred in 790 when Idris I marched eastward from Tlemcen and made an unsuccessful attempt to overthrow the Rustamids at their capital.

== Background ==
In 790 Idris I marched eastward to Tlemcen. The people of Tlemcen opened its gates for him and pledged allegiance to him, enabling him to seize the city without a fight.

== Battle ==
Following his seizure of Tlemcen, he directed his efforts towards the Rustamid capital of Tahert. He attempted an attack against Tahert, however he failed under its walls as a result of its strong defenders.

== Aftermath ==
Following this failure, he returned to Walila and left a governor in Tlemcen to represent him. Despite this attempt, the Rustamids did not face any serious threat from their neighbours in the ninth century.
