= Ibadi studies =

Field of research concerning the Ibadi school of Islam

Ibadism, or the Ibadi school of Islam, which has followers in Oman and elsewhere, has been the subject of much academic study. Much of the earlier writings from within the Islamic world presented Ibadism as a heresy. Western academic interest in Ibadism began in the mid-19th century, when translations of Ibadi texts and other literature began to become available. French and Italian scholars focussed mainly on Ibadism in North Africa, while John C. Wilkinson and other British scholars have studied it in Oman, where few texts were accessible until the 1970s.

Studies of Ibadism have adopted different perspectives. Some have been theologically based, locating Ibadi teachings among the different branches of Islam. Some have studied the origins of Ibadism in the context of early Islamic history. And some have set it in the context of Islamic jurisprudence. Regular conferences and publications since 2009 have helped bring Ibadism to wider attention.

== History of research ==
During the stage of the systematisation of Oriental Studies starting in the 19th century, Ibadism became marginalised. Furthermore, Ibadism suffered from being misunderstood by other Islamic schools. Early Islamic heresiographical works, due to their nature, considered Ibadism to be one of the extremist divisions of the Kharijite (Khawarije) movement. These approaches influenced both Muslim and non-Muslim researchers who tried to understand Ibadism, because several researchers considered heresiographic literature as the main source for understanding Islam. Due to the reproduction of stereotypical ideas about Ibadism, it became difficult to distinguish between actual Ibāḍī doctrine and the superstructure of opinion and especially to see Ibadism and Ibāḍīs independent of the Kharijites.

== Orientalism and Ibadism ==
The middle of the nineteenth century witnessed the expansion of European colonization in the Near East, which produced explorers’ accounts of the places they visited. During this period, travellers’ reports, politician's writings and scholars’ works on geography, politics and social life spread and proliferated. The general historical framework of the literature on Ibāḍī history was expanded and enriched. Works of French and Italian scholars focused mainly on North Africa, where the Ibāḍī communities spread over scattered locations in the Sahara. The French Orientalists had a keener interest in Algeria and Tunisia, while the Italians focused their attention on Libya. In contrast, the scholars who focused on Oman were mostly British or American.

This is of particular interest to those who apply Edward Said’s thesis on the relation between power and knowledge in post-Orientalism. For example, the French and Italian Orientalists were Enrico Insabato, André Nègre and Pessah Shinar. Additionally, the scholars who devoted some works to East Africa were from a variety of European countries for example: the French, A. Imbert (1903) and Gabriel Ferrand (1928), the German Albert Friedemann (1930), the British, W. Ingrams (1967) and the American, Michael Lofchie(1965). As far as Oman is concerned, most of the scholars were British, starting with S. B. Miles (1871) up to John Kelly (1956, 1964, 1968). Certainly, the highest level of scholarship was reached by John Wilkinson, who continues his academic work to this day. Modern historians hold that Wilkinson's writings on the religious, social and political structures of the Sultanate of Oman are the most important in this field. Russian Orientalists have also shown interest in Ibāḍī studies, beginning with V. R. Rosen. In more recent years, the Ukrainian Daniil Radivilov left his imprint on the field.

== Orientalist works on the history of Ibāḍī society ==
The works of Theodor Noeldeke and Goldzieher gained pre-eminence in the field of Islamic history. Both focused their studies on the emergence of Islam and early Islamic history. Despite these developments, Ibāḍī studies attracted very little attention. Another reason that may, to a certain degree, be held responsible for the marginalization of Ibadism, was that most Ibāḍī manuscripts were kept in remote Ibāḍī settlements and towns far away from the coastal areas and capitals, especially in North Africa. This relative isolation has led us to a few observations on the development of Ibāḍī studies in western Orientalism.

The two primary approaches to Ibāḍīs that dominated Western Oriental studies appeared in the mid-19th century. The first consisted in an attempt to understand Ibadism through the translated texts, whilst the second involved the compilation of bibliographic lists of Ibāḍī literature, most of which focused on historical works. Scholars interested in Omani sources were mostly from Great Britain. This is apparent from George Badger’s The Imams and Seyyid in Oman, the translation of the K. al-Fath al-Mubiyn fī sīrat al-Sadah al-Bus’īdiyīn by Ibn Ruzayq, published in 1871. In 1874, Charles Edward Ross published Annals of Oman from early times to the year 1728, and the translation of excerpts from the K. Kashf al-Ghuma by al-Sarhanī. Translations of North African Ibāḍī literature started in 1878 by the French Orientalist, Emile Masqueray, who translated part of the K. al-Siyar wa Akhbār al-Immah by Abū Zakariyā Yahīya b. Abī Bakr al-Warjālanī, which was followed by studies on the Ibāḍī of M'zab.

In 1885, A. Motylinski (1854–1907) translated parts of the “K. al-Jawāhir al-Muntaqāh” by Abū al Qāsim al-Barrādī. Al-Barrādī’s work presented a different view of early Islamic history after the battle of Siffīn and the development of Ibadism in North Africa. Certainly, Motylinski's broad interests have promoted North African studies in the European academic disciplines of linguistics, history and theology. In addition, several publications by the Italian orientalist Roberto Rubinacci are remarkable contributions to the study of Ibāḍī theology and religious history. Within the circle of French Orientalists, the Polish Orientalist Tadeusz Lewicki accomplished distinguished achievements. His studies started with the translation and commentary on some parts of the “K. al-Siyar” by Ahmad b. Sa‘īd al-Shammākhī in 1934. Furthermore, in 1935, Lewicki translated the “K. al-Tabqāt” by al-Darjīnī and his comments on Ibāḍī historical sources from North Africa are unique and uniquely important in the field. Lewicki must be considered as the most eminent expert on Ibadism in the mid- 20th century. In the field of bibliography, A. Motylinski produced the first list in 1885, containing the manuscripts of the Wadi Mzab in Algeria, after he had the chance to visit some private Ibāḍī libraries. Later on, Motylinski, having verified the authenticity of the work, introduced the “Tārikh” of Ibn al-Saghir and produced a short monograph on the Rustumid state. Next, Z. Smogorzewski (1919) published a list of Ibāḍī works in Oman and North Africa, which were also mentioned by both Strothmann (1927), and Rubinacci (1952).

Finally, there was the famous article by German-English Orientalist Joseph Schacht in 1956 after his visit to Wadi Mzab, which provided further impetus to the publication of philological works in Ibāḍī libraries. Schacht had a different perspective. Rather than focusing on historical works, he outlined the importance of Ibāḍī jurisprudence and theological works, in addition to conducting research in the early formation of Islam. Significantly, after Schacht's visit, some German scholars followed in his footsteps. The first step in this direction was taken by Hans Schluter in 1972 and 1975, then Josef van Ess (1975) and, finally, the Libyan Ibāḍī scholar ‘Amr al-Nami (1971). Many works continued to be published drawing on the libraries of North Africa. The geographical and political isolation of Oman at the beginning of the 20th century deprived scholars of access to Omani works and early Ibāḍī writings. The exploration of Omani literature started only in the mid-1970s, when John Wilkinson and G. Rex Smith published a number of writings on Ibadism in Oman.

== 20th-century Ibāḍī studies ==
At the beginning of the 20th century, the development of interdisciplinary, historical and philological studies promoted the study of Islamic theology and jurisprudence. The comparisons between different Islamic groups led researchers to write books and articles on heresiography and the history of Islamic theology. In 1902, the German Orientalist, Wellhausen, published his work on the religio-political groups in Islam, concentrating on the Kharijites and Shiites. This remarkable change of paradigm in the study of Ibadism and its history was introduced by the Italian researcher Laura Veccia Vaglieri. A number of her papers deal specifically with Ibadism. However, the most significant study was by the Italian Orientalist, Nallino (1916), who tried to understand the doctrinal affinities between Ibadism and the Mutaziltes. Indeed, Nallino, understood the Mu‘taziltes to be Islamic rationalists; however, Nallino was able to alter the way in which Oriental scholars’ related Islamic theology with classical philosophy. This, in turn, influenced the historical-political perspective on Ibadism, leading to a deeper study of Ibāḍī theology. Nallino was followed by his student, the Italian scholar Roberto Rubinacci, who continued Nallino's efforts and studied Ibāḍī doctrinal texts (creeds and epistles) which were published between 1949 and 1989. During the 1960s, the British scholar Watt Montgomery published several papers on Islamic theological history which treat of Wāsil b. Atta’ and the Kharijites, and of the Kharijites and their rebellions during Umayyad and Abbasid times. Unfortunately, he was unable to complete his studies. Perhaps this was due to the limited availability of materials for his research.

In the 1980s – 90s, the French scholar, Pierre Cuperly, published remarkable works focusing on the methodology for studying the early Ibāḍī theological epistles. Cuperly's main work provides an introduction to Ibāḍī Theology. He selected three creeds from early Ibāḍī epistles and tried to explore the development of Ibāḍī beliefs up to the 6th/12th century. Overall, German Scholars Wilferd Madelung and Josef van Ess reached the pinnacle of achievement in expounding Ibāḍī Theology, as they are the primary modern contributors to fostering the understanding of Islamic theology. They re-examined classical Islamic theological history and induced other scholars to explore how early Islamic theology emerged. Their numerous publications have opened a new dimension in the study of Islamic theology. Their knowledge of various Islamic theological groups has made them the foremost Orientalists in the study of classical Islamic theological history. Their contribution had an immediate impact on modern scholars, and, since the 1980s, scholars have conducted extensive research on Ibāḍī theology and jurisprudence inspired by their work. They proved that the study of the emergence and formation of Islam has been reflected significantly in the Ibāḍī literature which, as a consequence, has become a premier source for this field of study of Islam was inaugurated by John Wansbrough, Michael Cook, Martin Hinds, Patricia Crone, Gerald Hawting, and Andrew Rippin. In contrast, the branch of Oriental studies dealing with Ibāḍī jurisprudence is rather fragmented in its approach to the history and background of Ibāḍī jurisprudence. Thus, it is difficult to make a comprehensive survey of its contribution. We cannot deny that this was because of the limited availability of Ibāḍī works in print. Moreover, this deficiency might have been caused by the fact that, in the first half of 20th century, most Orientalists concentrated on classical Islamic philosophy and theology. To illustrate the contribution of the Orientalists, we should begin with the early articles published by E. Sachau in 1894, e.g., his paper on Abu al-Hasan al-Bisiyawi. Later, Sachau published a paper on Ibāḍīs on the eastern coast of Africa. Schacht's theories on “The origin of Muhammadian jurisprudence” have greatly influenced the study of Islamic jurisprudence and have induced researchers to examine his views. Undoubtedly, Schacht had a great impact on the reconstruction of the development of Islamic jurisprudence after Ignaz Goldziher’s work “Introduction to Islamic Theology and Law”. Since 1987, the finest work on Ibadi jurisprudence has been produced by Ersilia Francesca in the form of both books and articles. Later on, works by American researchers with an anthropological background on Oman's politics and economy began to appear in 1967 with Robert Landen and in 1978 with John Peterson, who is known for his extensive writings on the modern history and politics of Oman. Since 1980, Dale Eickelman has published many texts about Oman. In his anthropological writings, he compares Oman with different areas of the Muslim world. His work triggered the emergence of a new generation of American researchers in the field of Oman and Ibāḍī Studies, such as Valerie Hoffman, Mandana Limbert and Adam Gaiser.

New developments in the field of Ibāḍī studies were connected with – and also a result of – the publication of Ibāḍī books from Algeria, Oman, Egypt, Zanzibar, etc., since the end of the 19th century. These developments changed many previous concepts and introduced the notion of intellectual reformation process in the scholarship on Ibadism and the contributions of the scholars of Ibadism, such as, Nur al-Din Al-Salmi, and Muhammad ibn Yusuf Atfayyash, the author of “Sharh al Nail”, and Sulayman al-Baruni, all of whom advanced the field of Ibāḍī studies in recent years. Within this context, the study of Ibadism entered a stage of greater profundity and sophistication, thus becoming a more attractive subject of study to researchers and specialists. The critical text editions by Abulrahman al-Salimi and Wilferd Madelung, as well as a recent annotated translation of two theological primers by Ibāḍī theologians of the late thirteenth and the early nineteenth century respectively, namely the ʿAqīda al-wahbiyya by Nāṣir b. Sālim b. ʿUdayyam al-Rawahī and the Kitāb Maʿālim al-dīn by ʿAbd al-ʿAzīz al-Thamīmī (d. 1223/1808), with an introduction to the history of Ibāḍī doctrinal thought (Valerie Hoffman 2012) hold exceptional and unique interest for the history of Ibāḍī theology. Given the growing interest of international scholars in Ibāḍī studies, Ibāḍī theology will certainly play a prominent role in future scholarship. Conferences regularly held since 2009 on Ibadism are a major fact in this direction, attracting a number of experts in this field. On November 9–10, 2009, the first international conference in Europe on Ibadism (al-Ibadiyya), entitled “Ibadism, Ibāḍī Studies, and the Sultanate of Oman,” was held at Aristotle University of Thessaloniki in Greece. Since then, eight international conferences have been dedicated to Ibadism and all proceedings were published in the Series entitled Studies on Ibadism and Oman.

== See also ==
- List of Islamic scholars
