= Biledulgerid =

Barbariae et Biledulgerid, Nova Descriptio, 1570s map by Abraham Ortelius; Biledulgerid marked in red

Generall Mapp of the Coast of Barbarie, 1667 map by Richard Blome; Biledulgerid marked in yellow and subdivided into regions

Biledulgerid was a term used in early European maps for the Maghreb south of the Atlas Mountains. The name derives from Bilād al-Jarīd (بلاد الجريد, Land of the dates). The term's name was Latinized by the Berber scholar Leo Africanus, who claimed that Arabs referred to the entire region by this name, due to its richness in date palms). The region has many oases and cultivations.

While the majority of mapmakers in Europe during the 15th to 17th century only detailed the coastal Mediterranean areas of Barbary Coast, some already named the southern inlands of the Maghreb which were rarely travelled, due to their harsh weather conditions, and had been primarily known from second-hand reports. By the mid-16th century, inspired by the reports of Leo Africanus, geographers began using the name "Biledulgerid" as a collective term for all non-coastal entities – kingdoms, principalities, or regions – throughout the Saharan Maghreb, stretching parallel to the Barbary Coast in the north. Around 1700, these known entities included, from west to east: Tesset (southern Morocco); Darha (around the Draa River); Zegelmesse/Segelomessa (south of Fes, Morocco); Tigorin/Tegorarina, Zeb/Zebum, and Mezzab (south of Algiers, Algeria); Biledulgerid proper (south of Tunis, Tunisia); the subregions of Techort, Guargala,Gademes (southwest, south, and southeast of Biledulgerid proper);Fezzen (south of Tripolitania, Libya); and Teorregu. The two regions south of Tripolitania and Teorregu were sometimes rather counted toward Barcas (Cyrenaica, Libya), the neighboring region to the east. Certain geographers sometimes included Barcas, however contrarily, into the greater Biledulgerid region. The Barbary Coast and the wider Biledulgerid inlands did not include the Nile Valley.

Due to the same etymology, the area known previously as ‘Biledulgerid proper’ still bears the name in certain languages. The comparably small area southwest of Tunis is known today as Djerid.

By the end of the 18th century, the geographical term 'Biledulgerid' became increasingly antiquated, as more information about its areas became available and its “subregions” became far less static than previously believed. A few foreign publications still used the geographical term into the 19th century. For example, the Encyclopaedia Americana in 1830 conflated both correct information about Tunisia's Djerid region and its agricultural products, as well as outdated details about the Maghreb's inlands that, during previous centuries, had been considered parts of the historic 'greater Biledulgerid.'

== Bibliography ==
- Lieber, Francis; et al., eds. (1830), "Biledulgerid", Encyclopaedia Americana... on the Basis of the Seventh Edition of the German Conversations-Lexicon, vol. II, Philadelphia: Carey & Lea, p. 103. (The German version of that encyclopedia's article is a direct translation, identically found already in prints from 1822, e.g. digital version, page 354)
- Carey, William (1792), An Enquiry into the Obligation of Christians to Use Means for the Conversion of the Heathens... (PDF), Leicester: Ann Ireland
