= Abu al-Abbas Ahmad al-Darjini =

Ibadi scholar (c. 1208–1270)

- Born: 1208 (possibly); Biledulgerid
- Died: 1270 (possibly); Naftah (present-day Tunisia)
- Notable work: Kitab Tabaqat al-Mashayikh bil-Maghrib
- Arabic name
- Personal (Ism): Ahmad أحمد
- Teknonymic (Kunya): Abu al-Abbas أبو العباس
- Toponymic (Nisba): al-Darjini الدرجيني

Abu al-Abbas Ahmad al-Darjini (Arabic: أبو العباس أحمد الدريجي) was an Ibadi Muslim scholar. He is mostly known for his book Kitab Tabaqat al-Mashayikh bil-Maghrib.

== Biography ==
His full name Abu al-‘Abbas Ahmad ibn Sa‘id ibn Sulayman ibn ‘Ali ibn Yakhlaff al-Mazati al-Darjini. He was born and educated in the al-Jerid region, in what is now Tunisia, hailing from a family with deep roots in the area.

His principal work is Kitab Tabaqat al-Mashayikh, also known by its later title Kitab Tabaqat al-Mashayikh bil-Maghrib. The term Maghrib was added by modern editors to reflect the book's primary focus on the Ibadi community in North Africa. Much of the work is based on, and directly drawn from, the earlier Kitab Siyar al-Aimmah wa Akhbaruhum by Abu Zakariyya al-Warjlani.

== See also ==
- Qal'at Darjin
- Ahmad ibn Said al-Shammakhi
- Ibn al-Saghir

== Bibliography ==
- علال [Allal], بن عمر [Ben Omar] (2023-06-11). "رسالة سعيد بن سليمان الدرجيني (بين ق: 6-7هـ / 12-13م) إلى ابنه أبي العباس أحمد، صاحب طبقات المشايخ بالمغرب: "في طلب العلم والحث عليه" - دراسة وتحقيق" [Correspondence from Said ibn Suleiman al-Darjini (circa 6-7 AH / 12-13 AD) addressed to his son Abu al-Abbas Ahmad, the author of "Kitab Tabaqat al-Mashayikh bil-Maghrib": "On the Pursuit of Knowledge and the Encouragement of Its Acquisition" - A Study and Examination]. مجلة المعارف للبحوث والدراسات التاريخية [Majallat al-Ma'arif lil-Buhuth wal-Dirasat al-Tarikhiyya] (in Arabic). 8 (3): 265–292.
- أبو القاسم [Abu al-Qasim], سعد الله [Sa'd Allah] (2015). تاريخ الجزائر الثقافي، من الفتح الإسلامي إلى نهاية القرن التاسع الهجري [The cultural history of Algeria, from the Islamic conquest to the end of the ninth century AH] (in Arabic). Vol. 2 (1st ed.). Algiers (Algeria): عالم المعرفة [Aalam al-Ma'rifah.] pp. 395–397. ISBN 978-9947-912-70-6.
- الريامي [Al-Riyami], علي بن سعيد [Ali-bin-Sa'id] (2024). "الدرجيني ومنهجه في "كتاب طبقات المشايخ بالمغرب [Al-Darjini and His Method in Kitab Tabaqat al-Mashayikh bil-Maghrib] (in Arabic) (1st ed.). Amman (Jordan): الآن ناشرون وموزعون [Al-Aan-Nashirun-wa-Muwaziun]. ISBN 9789999253017.
- Yarbrough, Luke (2020-12-15), "41. The Conversion of Medieval Ghāna as Narrated by a Later Ibādī Scholar, by Abū al-ʿAbbās Ahmad b. Saʿīd al-Darjīnī", Conversion to Islam in the Premodern Age, University of California Press, pp. 253–255, doi:10.1525/9780520969100-048, ISBN 978-0-520-96910-0
