= Qal'at Darjin =

Old city in Tunisia

Qalʿat Darjin (Arabic: قلعة درجين) was an old city situated in modern-day Tunisia.

== History ==
Important Ibadi manuscripts have been destroyed during the burning of the city.

== See also ==
- Abu al-Abbas Ahmad al-Darjini (scholar from the city)
- Al-Mu'izz ibn Badis
