= Muhammad ibn al-Ash'ath al-Khuza'i =

Abbasid general and governor (died 766)

Muhammad ibn al-Ash'ath al-Khuza'i محمد بن الاشعث الخزاعي

Governor of Tabasayn, Fars, Kerman
- In office 750–755
- Monarchs: Al-Saffah, Al-Mansur

Governor of Egypt
- In office 759–760
- Monarch: Al-Mansur
- Preceded by: Musa ibn Ka'b al-Tamimi
- Succeeded by: Humayd ibn Qahtaba

Governor of Ifriqiya and Maghrib
- In office 762–765
- Monarch: Al-Mansur
- Preceded by: Abd al-Rahman ibn Rustem al-Farissi (Kharijite rebel), 760–62
- Succeeded by: Isa ibn Yussuf al-Khurasani

Personal details
- Died: 766
- Children: Ja'far; Nasr
- Parent: al-Ash'ath

Military service
- Allegiance: Abbasid Caliphate
- Years of service: 750–765
- Rank: Commander

Muhammad ibn al-Ash'ath al-Khuza'i (Arabic: محمد بن الاشعث الخزاعي) was an early Abbasid follower and later became Abbasid governor in Iran, Egypt and Ifriqiya for the Abbasid Caliphate.

== Life ==
Muhammad was a deputy naqib during the Abbasid missionary phase in Khurasan and the Abbasid Revolution that followed. Upon the spread of the Revolution, Abu Muslim appointed Muhammad as governor of Tabasayn, Fars and Kerman. In 755 he participated in the suppression of the rebellion of Sunpadh at Rayy, and in the next year fought against another rebel, Jawhar ibn Marar, also at Rayy (although the two events may have been mixed up in the sources, so that Muhammad may in reality have been present only at one).

In 758/9, he was named governor of Egypt, a post he held until 760/1, and was then sent west to conquer Ifriqiya for the Abbasids from the Ibadites in 761. According to the Mamluk historian Safadi, he was also governor of Damascus under al-Mansur. Muhammad died in 766, while on his way to take part in a summer raid against the Byzantine Empire.

His sons also had distinguished careers: Ja'far was sahib al-shurta for Harun al-Rashid and governor of Khurasan, while Nasr was governor of Palestine and of Sindh.

== Sources ==
- Crone, Patricia (1980). Slaves on horses: the evolution of the Islamic polity. Cambridge and New York: Cambridge University Press. ISBN 0-521-52940-9.

Preceded by Musa ibn Ka'b al-Tamimi	Governor of Egypt; 759–760	Succeeded by Humayd ibn Qahtaba
