= Ali Yahya Muammar =

Libyan Ibadi scholar

Ali Yahya Maammar
- علي يحيى معمر
- Born: 1919; Takwit, Nalut, Tripolitania, Libya
- Died: January 15, 1980 (aged 60–61); Tripoli, Libya
- Resting place: Sidi Mundir Cemetery, Tripoli
- Occupations: Scholar, educator, writer
- Known for: Islamic scholarship, Ibadi reformism, Ibadi historian
- Notable work: Al-Ibādiyya fī Mawkib al-Tārīkh, Al-Ibādiyya bayna al-Firaq al-Islāmiyya, Al-Ibādiyya Madhhab Islāmī Muʿtadil
- Movement: Ibadism

Ali Yahya Muammar (Arabic: علي يحيى معمر) was a Libyan Ibadi scholar, educator, author, and reformer.

== Early life ==
Ali bin Yahya Maʿmar was born in 1919 in the village of Takwit, on the outskirts of Nalut, approximately 15 kilometers to the west, in the Libyan region of Jabal Nafusa.

== See also ==
- Ibadism
