= Salama ibn Sa'd =

Ibadi Muslim scholar (fl. 752)

- Arabic name
- Patronymic (Nasab): Ibn Sa'd ابن سعد
- Teknonymic (Kunya): Salama سلمة

Salama ibn Sa'd ibn Ali ibn Asad al-Hadrami al-Yamani (Arabic: سلمة بن سعد, fl. 752) was an Islamic scholar, considered the first Ibadi preacher to arrive in the Maghreb to promote this school of thought. He studied under Jabir ibn Zayd and Abu Ubayda Muslim ibn Abi Karima.

== Biography ==
Salama ibn Sa’d was not originally from Basra, but he became associated with the city after traveling there to seek knowledge. He adopted the Ibadite principles from Jabir ibn Zayd and Abu Ubayda Muslim.

According to historical sources, Salama ibn Sa'd was the first to come from Basrah to the Maghreb to preach Ibadism.Little is known about his life, as both his birth and death dates, as well as their locations, remain unknown. French scholar Cyrille Ailletnotes that there are no records of Salama ibn Sa'd outside Ibadi sources.

== See also ==
- Ibadism
- Abdallah ibn Ibad
- Abu Ubayda Muslim ibn Abi Karima
- Jabir ibn Zayd
- Ikrima ibn Abd Allah al-Barbari
