= Abu Ubayda Muslim ibn Abi Karima =

Ibadi preacher (c.665-762)

- Born: c. 665–666; Basra
- Died: c. 762
- Arabic name
- Personal (Ism): مسلم; Muslim
- Patronymic (Nasab): Ibn Abi Karima ابن أبي كريمة
- Teknonymic (Kunya): Abu Ubayda أبو عبيدة

Abū ʿUbayda Muslim ibn Abī Karīma al-Tamīmī (Arabic: أبو عبيدة مسلم بن أبي كريمة التميمي) was an Ibadi Islamic scholar and main figure in Basra, known for his teachings and influence. He studied under Jabir ibn Zayd, who greatly shaped his understanding of Ibadi thought.

== Biography ==
Abu Ubayda was born in Basra, in modern-day Iraq. His exact birth date is unknown, but it is estimated to be around 45 AH (665–666 CE). His father's name may have alternatively been recorded as Kudin or Kurin, and he was a mawla of the Banu Tamim, specifically associated with Urwa ibn Udayya. Following his release, while initially inclined to come to terms with the Umayyads, his fear of schism among the moderate Kharijites led him to adopt a different strategy. Embracing a state of concealment (kitman) in Basra, where they did not openly rebel while staying connected to provincial uprisings, he established missionary teams called hamalat al-'ilm ("bearers of knowledge"). These teams propagated Ibadi teachings and promoted anti-Umayyad movements in regions less vulnerable to immediate Umayyad control, such as Khurasan, Oman, Yemen, the Hadramawt, and the Maghreb. Abu Ubayda Muslim was imprisoned by Al-Hajjaj ibn Yusuf, who persecuted the Ibadi community. He remained in prison until Al-Hajjaj's death. Following his death, Al-Rabi' bin Habib al-Farahidi succeeded him as the head of the Ibadis in Basra.

== See also ==
- Ibadism
- Jabir ibn Zayd
- Abdallah ibn Ibad
- Abd al-Rahman ibn Rustam
- Salama ibn Sa'd
