= Abd al-Wahhab ibn Abd al-Rahman =

- Imam; Faqīh
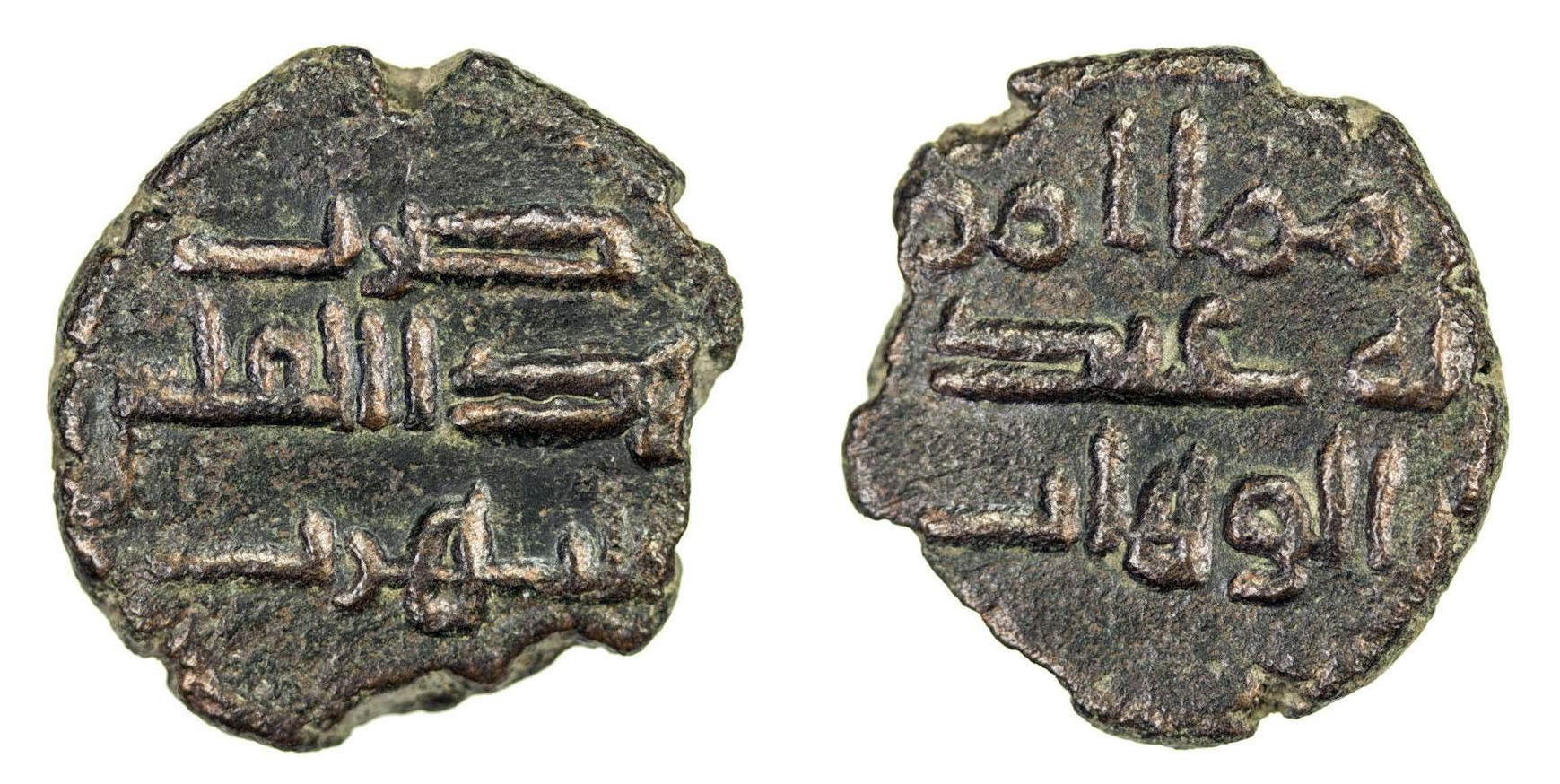

Imam of Maghreb al-Awsat
- Reign: 788–824
- Predecessor: Abd al-Rahman ibn Rustam
- Successor: Abu Sai'd Aflah ibn Abd al-Wahhab
- Born: 747/748; Tahert
- Died: 823/824
- Issue: Aflah ibn Abd al-Wahhab
- House: Rustamid dynasty
- Father: Abd al-Rahman ibn Rustam

Abd al-Wahhab ibn Abd al-Rahman ibn Rustam, was the second imam of the Imamate of Tahart and founder of the Wahbi Ibadism movement. He was part of the Rustamid dynasty that ruled a theocracy in Algeria. He became ruler after the death of his father, Abd al-Rahman ibn Rustam and founded an external Islamic religious movement called Wahhabism relative to his name Abd al-Wahhab. His Ibadi Kharijite preaching is often incorrectly associated with the modern day Wahhabi movement.

== Early life ==
Abd al-Wahhab was born in 747/748. His father was a Persian Ibadi Muslim imam, Abd al-Rahman ibn Rustam, the founder of the Rustamid dynasty in Algeria. He studied Abu Ubayda Muslim ibn Abi Karima's ideas and beliefs under his father, who was also a transmitter of Ibadi tradition. He received the state after the death of his father in 788. In 789, he let Idris I to capture Tlemcen without any negative reaction, however a subsequent attempt by Idris I to overthrow the Rustamids in the Battle of Tahert failed. He died, probably, in the year 823/824.
