= Ahmad ibn Said al-Shammakhi =

Ibadi Muslim scholar and writer (c. 1441-1522)

- Born: 1441 or 1456 (possibly); Yafran
- Died: 1522
- Notable work: Kitab al-Siyar
- Arabic name
- Personal (Ism): Ahmad أحمد
- Teknonymic (Kunya): Abu al-Abbas أبو العباس
- Toponymic (Nisba): al-Shammakhi الشماخي

Ahmad ibn Said al-Shammakhi or Badr al-Din al-Shammakhi (Arabic: بدر الدين الشمّاخي: أحمد ابن سعيد الشمّاخي), was an Ibadi scholar and author, primarily known for his work Kitab al-Siyar.

== Early life ==
Abu al-Abbas Ahmad ibn Abi Uthman Said ibn Abd al-Wahid ibn Said ibn Abi al-Fadl Qasim ibn Sulayman ibn Muhammad ibn Umar ibn Yahya ibn Ibrahim ibn Musa ibn Abi Sakin Amir ibn Ali ibn Amir ibn Yasifaw, commonly known as Badr al-Din al-Shammakhi

He was born in the village of al-Qusayr, near Yafran in the Nafusa Mountains, which is located in modern-day Libya. Historical sources do not record his exact date of birth, which remains unknown. However it is estimated to be around 845 AH (c. 1441 CE) or possibly later, around 860 AH (c. 1456 CE), but most sources generally agree that his birth likely occurred sometime during the 840s AH.

== Works ==
Ahmad ibn Said al-Shamakhi’s most significant work is his biographical work titled Kitab al-Siyar. This text is considered one of the foundational sources for the history of Ibadi community in North Africa.

== See also ==
- Ahmed Al-Darjini
- Abu Zakariyya al-Warjlani
