= Ibn al-Saghir =

- ابن الصغير
- Born: Between 878–884; Unknown
- Died: Unknown; Unknown
- Era: Rustumid Imamate

Ibn al-Saghir or Ibn Saghir (Arabic: ابن الصغير) was a 10th-century Muslim historian and chronicler who lived in the city of Tihert, which was a significant center during the rule of the Rustamids. He is best known for his work Akhbar al-Aʾimma al-Rustamiyyin, a detailed account of the Rustamid imams and their governance, written around 903.

== Early life ==
Ibn Saghir is known by this nickname, but his full name is not documented. Little is known about him beyond the details gathered from his notable work, where he chronicles the Rustumid rulers (imamas) of Tihert. Similarly, details about his birth date and place are also unknown.

Lebanese scholar Wadad Kadi estimates Ibn al-Saghir's birthdate to be between 265 AH and 270 AH (878–884 CE). This estimate is based on his witnessing the final years of the reign of Abu al-Yakzan Muhammad (r. 874–894), attending the majlis held in the presence of the Rustumid imam at the Great Mosque of Tihert (al-Masjid al-Jamaa), and being referred to as 'يا بني' ('O my child'), suggesting he was young at the time. Kadi's estimation is further supported by the death of Abu al-Yakzan Muhammad in 281 AH (894 CE).

The origins of Ibn al-Saghir remain unknown, as no definitive historical evidence has yet been discovered. However, several suppositions have been proposed. Wadad Kadi suggests that he may have been a Maghrebi, noting his limited knowledge of the Abbasid caliphs in the East. She further speculates that he was possibly from Tihert (in modern day-Algeria). In contrast, Algerian scholars Brahim Bahaz and Muhammad Nasir, who edited and annotated his book, argue that he was not from Tihert. They base this on a passage in Ibn al-Saghir's work stating: "No outsider ever came to dwell among them without settling with them and building in their midst", which, they suggest, indicates that he was not originally one of them, so he was not one of the local inhabitants of the city. They propose that he might originate from Kufa or Basra (in modern-day Iraq) or Kairouan (in modern-day Tunisia).

Ibrahim Bahaz and Muhammad Nasir argue that "Ibn al-Saghir likely arrived in Tihert during the final years of Abu al-Yakzan Muhammad’s reign and settled there. This would explain why, in the first part of his book, he relies on oral accounts from trusted Ibadi sources, while in the second part, he documents events he personally witnessed during the Rustumid rule".

In his early years in Tihert, the city where he was raised and resided, Ibn al-Saghir began his commercial activity by operating a small shop (dukkān) in the al-Rahadina district.

== See also ==
- Rustumid dynasty
- Abu Zakariyya al-Warjlani
- Ahmad ibn Said al-Shammakhi
- Abu al-Abbas Ahmad al-Darjini
