= Ikrima al-Barbari =

Muslim scholar (c.645-723)

Ikrima ibn Abd Allah al-Barbari
- عكرمة ابن عبد الله البربري
- Born: 645
- Died: 723 (aged 77–78)
- Occupation: Muslim scholar

Ikrima ibn Abd Allah al-Barbari (Arabic: عكرمة ابن عبد الله البربري) was a Muslim scholar of Berber descent, he was a mawla of Ibn Abbas.

== Biography ==
Ikrima was a mawla (client) of Ibn Abbas (d. c. 687), a cousin of the Islamic Prophet Muhammad. According to Ibadi sources, Ikrima ibn Abd Allah and Salama ibn Sad traveled to the Maghreb to spread their respective Islamic schools of thought. Ikrima preached the Sufri teachings, while Salama promoted Ibadism.

== See also ==
- Sufri
- Ibadism
- Midrarid dynasty
