= Jabir ibn Zayd =

First imam of Ibadis, muhaddith and faqih

Abu al-Sha'tha Jabir ibn Zayd al-Yahmadi al-Azdi (Arabic: أبو الشعثاء جابر بن زيد اليحمدي الأزدي, romanized: ʾAbū al-Shaʿthāʾ Jābir ibn Zayd al-Yaḥmadī al-ʾAzdī) was an Islamic scholar, theologian and one of the founding figures of the Ibadis, the third major denomination of Islam. He was from the Tabi‘un, or second generation of Islam, and took leadership of the denomination after the death of Abd-Allah ibn Ibadh.

== Life ==
Ibn Zayd was born in the village of Firaq, near modern-day Nizwa in Oman. As a tabi'i from the second generation of Muslims, he was a student of Prophet Muhammad's widow Aisha and cousin Abd Allah ibn Abbas.

Umayyad governor al-Hajjaj ibn Yusuf had friendly relations with Ibn Zayd personally, as the former viewed the Ibadi denomination as a more moderate branch of the Khawarij that could be used as a bulwark against the more extreme adherents. This ended after Ibn Zayd ordered the execution of one of al-Hajjaj's spies, which led many Ibadis to be either imprisoned or exiled to Oman. After the death of Ibn Ibad, Ibn Zayd led the Ibadis to Oman where the aḥādīth ṣaḥīḥat al-isnād he narrated from different companions of Muhammad formed the corpus of the Ibadi interpretation of Islamic law.

== Legacy ==
Ibn Zayd is well respected by both his denomination as well as adherents of Sunni Islam, holding roughly the same level of prestige as the Sunnis' own Hasan of Basra. He is the most commonly cited transmitter in Jami'ul Sahih, one of the two hadith collections of the Ibadis.

== See also ==
- Abu Ubaida Muslim ibn Abi Karima
