= Rustamid dynasty =

Ibadi ruling house in Algeria (777–909)

Rustamid Imamate الرستميون
- 777–909
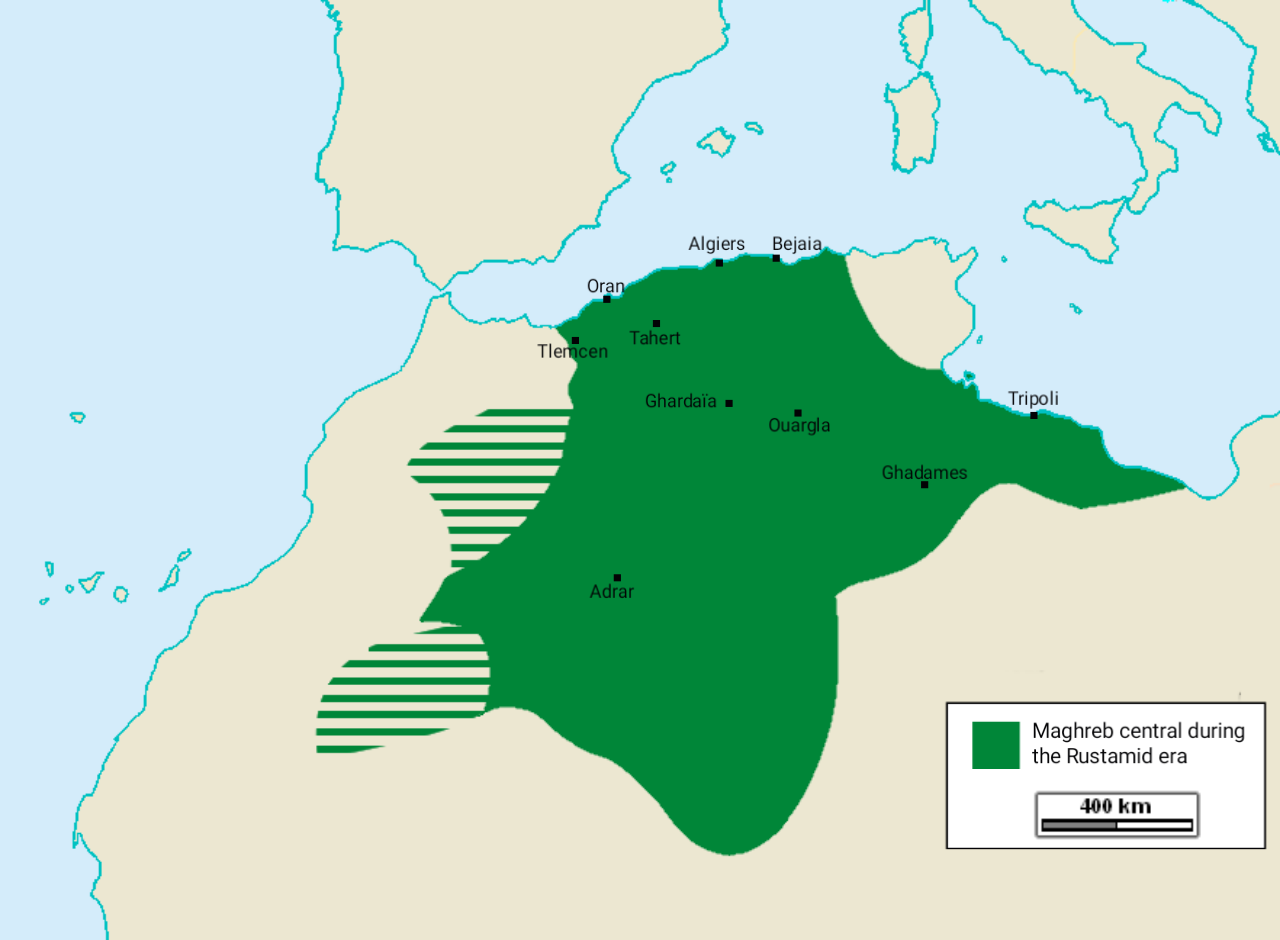
- Extent of Rustamid control in 761.
- Capital: Tahert
- Official languages: Arabic
- Common languages: Arabic, Berber, Persian
- Religion: Ibadi Islam
- Government: Theocratic Imamate
- Imam
  - 777–788: Abd al-Rahman ibn Rustam
  - 906–909: Yaqzan ibn Muhammad
- History
  - Established: 777
  - Capture of Tahert: 909
Preceded by	Succeeded by
Berber revolt; Emirate of Tlemcen	Fatimid Caliphate
- Today part of: Algeria; Tunisia; Libya

The Rustamid dynasty (Arabic: الرستميون) was an Ibadi dynasty of Persian origin which ruled a state that was centered in present-day Algeria. The dynasty governed as a Muslim theocracy for a century and a half from its capital Tahert (present day Tagdemt) until the Isma'ili Fatimid Caliphate defeated it. Rustamid authority extended over what is now central and western Algeria, parts of southern Tunisia, and the Jebel Nafusa and Fezzan regions in Libya as far as Zawila.

== History ==
=== Origins ===
The founder of the dynasty, Abd al-Rahman ibn Rustam, was of Persian origin and descended from a mawla of Rashidun caliph Uthman ibn Affan, who may have been related to a Persian general killed at the Battle of al-Qadisiyyah. They claimed descent from the Kings of Kings of the Sasanian Empire.

=== Background ===
The Ibadi movement reached North Africa by 719, when the missionary Salama ibn Sa'd was sent from the Ibadi jama'a of Basra to Kairouan. By 740, their efforts had converted the major Berber tribes of Hawwara around Tripoli, in the Nafusa Mountains and at Zenata in western Tripolitania. In 757 (140 AH), a group of four Basra-educated missionaries including Abd al-Rahman ibn Rustam proclaimed an Ibadi imamate in Tripolitania, starting an abortive state led by Abu al-Khattab Abdul-A'la ibn as-Samh which lasted until the Abbasid Caliphate dispatched Muhammad ibn al-Ash'ath al-Khuza'i to suppress it in 761. During that period, Abd al-Rahman served as governor of Qayrawan from 758 to 761. Ifriqiya was conquered by the Abbasids from Kharijite control and Abu al-Khattab ibn as-Samh was killed. On his death, the Tripolitanian Ibādiyya elected Abu al-Hatim al-Malzuzi as Imam; he was killed in 772 after launching a second unsuccessful revolt in 768.

=== Rise ===
In 777, Abd al-Rahman ibn Rustam, an Ifriqiyan-born convert to the Ibadi movement and one of the four founders of the imamate, was elected Imam; after this, the post remained in his family, a practice which the Ibadiyya justified by noting that he came from no tribe, and thus his election as imam would not favour the domination of one Ibadi tribe over the others. Initially, ibn Rustam received financial assistance from the Kharijites of Basra.

The new imamate was centered on the newly built capital of Tahert (or Tahart), near present-day Tiaret. Several Ibadi tribes displaced from Tunisia and Tripolitania settled there and strong fortifications were built. Al-Bakri mentions that after the establishment of Tahert, tribes within the area congregated around the vicinity of Tahert as the town was conceived of as a military base of the Imam and leader of the Ibadi tribes. The town was surrounded by a strong wall, it had a fortress, a commercial center, regular supply of water, gardens of fruit and vegetables and it was foremost a religious and economic center of the region. It eventually became a center along the caravan trade route to the Near East, this economic prosperity resulted in the later settlement of non-Ibadite Muslims and Christians.

By the turn of the ninth century, the Rustamids controlled much of the central Maghreb and its territory streched until Tlemcen in the west. However, its area contracted to Tahert and the area surrounding it by the 880s. Despite this, the spiritual authority of the Rustamid imams extended beyond its territory, as Kharijite tribes recognized their authority in the Aurès and Zab—areas nominally under Aghlabid rule—as well as Jabal Nafusa.

In 812, Imam Abd al-Wahhab ibn Abd al-Rahman supported the Huwara in their siege of Tripoli, which was held by the Aghlabids. They reached a modus vivendi; this displeased Ibādī tribes on the Aghlabid border, who launched a few rebellions. Aghlabid Emir Abdallah ibn Ibrahim made peace with the Rustamids by ceding Tripolitania. Eventually, the Rustamids' authority was recognized by the Ibadis of southern Tunisia, Djerba, Wargla, and the Sufrites of Sijilmasa.

The Rustamids established positive relations with the Midrarid dynasty of Sijilmasa and the Umayyads of Córdoba, but were attacked by the Idrisid dynasty of Fez in 789 or 790. During Abu al-Yazqan's reign, the Rustamids recognized the suzerainty of the Umayyads.

=== Decline ===
In 873, a succession crisis occurred as the third imam Abu Bakr, fearing the loss of his title to his older brother Mohammed Abu al-Yaqzan, attempted to assassinate him. However, his plot failed, leading to the population uprising against Abu Bakr, resulting in his overthrow and death in 874. Consequently, Mohammed Abu al-Yaqzan assumed the title.

After Abd al-Wahhab, the Rustamids grew militarily weak; they were easily conquered by the Isma'ili Fatimids in 909, upon which many Ibadis – including the last imam – fled to the Sedrata tribe of Ouargla, whence they would ultimately emigrate to M'zab. Among the reasons behind the fall of the Rustamid state was their non-compliance with the Kharijite requirement that the imam must be elected by consultation. The Rustamids' decision to rule as a hereditary dynasty lost them popular support from the populace, who viewed their rule as tyrannical akin to that of the Abbasid Caliphate.

== Society and culture ==
The Rustamid dynasty, "developed a cosmopolitan reputation in which Christians, non-Kharijite Muslims, and adherents of different sects of Kharijites lived". On the intellectual field, the Rustamids had many scholars and learned men, such as Abd al-Rahman ibn Rustam, Abd al-Wahhab ibn Abd al-Rahman, Aflah ibn ‘Abd al-Wahhab, dan Abu al-Yaqzhan ibn Aflah, Mahdi an-Nafusi, ‘Abd Allah al-Lamthi, and Mahmud ibn Bakr. ‘Abd ar-Rahman had an exegesis of the Qur’an. ‘Abd al-Wahhab wrote his Masa'il Nafusah on Islamic jurisprudence. Aflah mastered Arabic literature, mathematics, and astronomy. Abu al-Yaqzhan wrote about 40 works. Because of their intellectual enthusiasm, the Rustamids vigorously transferred valuable works from the Mashriq to the Maghrib, especially to the library of al-Ma‘shumah (in Tahert) and that of Khizanah Nafusah (in Jabal Nafusah).

Moreover, Tahert was famous as ‘Iraq al-Maghrib, al-‘Iraq ash-Shaghir, 'Balkh al-Maghrib', or 'Little Basra'. Apart from these achievements, the Rustamids also had significant contribution to Islamization in the Maghrib and Bilad as-Sudan. For about two centuries (130–340 AH / 750–950 AD), the Kharijite people gained control of trade routes in the Maghrib and Bilad as-Sudan. Many Ibadite merchants made journeys along the vast area, such as Tahert, Wargla, Nafzawa, Jabal Nafusah, Tadmakkat, Gao, and Ghana. By this economic activity, the Ibadites took advantages of trading business and preaching Islam at the same time.

The Rustamid dynasty's origin accounted for the large presence of Persians in Tahert in the 9th century.

== Rustamid imams ==
- Abd al-Rahman ibn Rustam (Bānū-Bādūsyān) (776–788)
- Abd al-Wahhab ibn Abd al-Rahman (788–824)
- Aflah ibn Abd al-Wahhab (824–872)
- Abu Bakr ibn Aflah (872–874)
- Muhammad Abu al-Yaqzan ibn Aflah (874–894)
- Yusuf Abu Hatim ibn Muhammad (894–895)
- Ya'qub ibn Aflah (895–899)
- Yusuf Abu Hatim ibn Muhammad, again (899–906)
- Yaqzan ibn Muhammad Abi l-Yaqzan (906–909)

== See also ==
- Banu Masala
