= Nukkariyya =

School of thought within Ibadism

Nukkar among other Ibadi branches (in brown)

Nukkariyya (Arabic: النُّكارية, lit. 'al-Nukkāriyya'),“Deniers,” also called the Nakkara or al-Nakkariyya or Yazidiyya was one of the main branches of Ibadi Islam, founded in 784 by Abu Qudama Yazid ibn Fandin al-Ifrani. Led by Abu Yazid al-Nukkari, they revolted against the ruling Fatimids in Ifriqiya (today's Tunisia and eastern Algeria), conquering Kairouan in 944 and laying siege to Sousse, but were ultimately defeated in 947. The Nukkari were known as "Yazidiyya" due to their founder, Yazid al-Irfani, and had no connection to the Adawiyya Kurds, who were called Yazidiyya allegedly due to their reverence of Yazid ibn Muawiya. Remnants of the Nukkari are thought to have survived on the island of Djerba and zuwara. They split from mainstream Ibadism, i.e. the Wahbi. The parent branch of Nukkari, Wahbi Ibadism, was the most mainstream of the schools of thought within Ibadism, due to the fact that most preserved Ibadi texts can be attributed to Wahbi affiliated scholars.

The dating of early Wahbi writings such as kutub al-rudud and siras (letters) has led some analysts such as Salim al-Harithi to claim Ibadism as the oldest sect within Islam. However others suggest Ibadism only took on characteristics of a sect and a full-fledged madhab during the demise of the Rustamid dynasty. The term Wahbi is chiefly derived as an eponymous intimation to the teachings of Abdullah bin Wahb al-Rasibi. Although the term Wahbi was initially considered superfluous as Ibadism was largely homogenous, its usage increased upon the advent of the Nukkari secession in order to differentiate the Wahbis from the off-shoot Ibadis. The most common epithet Wahbi Ibadi clerics enjoined their adherents to apply to themselves is the term ahl al istiqama meaning those on the straight path. They rejected the usage of ahl al -sunnah as early usage assigned the term sunnah as the practise of Muawiyah cursing Ali ibn Abi Talib from the pulpits, although during the Umayyad era, this meaning changed.

== See also ==
- Rustamid dynasty
