= Al-Julanda bin Masud =

Al-Julanda bin Masud الجلندى بن مسعود
- Imam

First Imam of the Imamate of Oman
- Reign: 749 – 751 CE
- Successor: Muhammad bin Affan
- Died: 751 CE / 134 AH
- Tribe: Banu al-Julanda of Azd
- Religion: Ibadi Islam

Al-Julanda bin Masud (Arabic: الجلندى بن مسعود, romanized: al-Julandā ibn Masʿūd; died 751 CE) was an Ibadi religious leader who was elected the first Ibadi imam of Oman, ruling from 749 until his death defending against an Abbasid invasion in 751 CE.

== Ancestry ==
Al-Julanda bin Masud belonged to the al-Julanda family of Azd, who had ruled Oman from the 6th century CE until their overthrow by an Umayyad army led by Al-Hajjaj ibn Yusuf during the reign of Abd al-Malik ibn Marwan. His grandfather, Jayfar bin al-Julanda, co-ruled Oman with his brother during the advent of Islam and accepted the faith after receiving a letter from Muhammad.

== Biography ==
=== Election ===
There is no mention of interactions between al-Julanda and the Ibadi school until the Ibadi revolt, during which he pledged allegiance to its leader Abdullah bin Yahya al-Kindi. Unlike the Ibadi preachers active in Oman, he does not appear to have had connections with Basra, then a centre of the school. He was elected as imam by the Ibadi ulama in 749. The election may have been motivated by a desire to secure the loyalty of his family for the new imamate, who historically opposed the school, and the tribes who traditionally respected their rule.

Despite this, al-Julanda faced opposition from a rival clan within his family. Ja'far bin Sa'id al-Julandi and his two sons refused to pledge allegiance to al-Julanda, rousing the non-Ibadi tribes against him and undermining his authority in the Omani interior. The strife culminated in al-Julanda ordering the execution of his familial opponents, including Ja'far and his sons. Ibadi zealots censured al-Julanda for expressing grief after the deed, accusing him of asabiyyah.

=== Conflict with the Sufrites ===
Al-Julanda's election coincided with the establishment of the Abbasid Caliphate. The new caliph, As-Saffah, was eager to assert his authority over rebellious groups along the Gulf coast. He dispatched a 700-strong army under Khazim bin Khuzaymah to defeat the new imamate and Sufri Kharijites led by Shayban al-Yashkuri who had sought refuge on the island of Ibn Kawan. The army embarked from Basra on ships provided by the city's governor and departed for Ibn Kawan. The Sufrites were defeated and the few survivors fled by sea to Julfar, which lay within the imamate's territory. Al-Julanda sent his general Yahya bin Najih to confront them, demanding they embrace Ibadism or leave peacefully. Unwilling to abandon their doctrines and aware that the Abbasid army was in pursuit, the Sufrites resolved to fight instead. Following a final ultimatum from Yahya, the two forces clashed. The Sufrites were defeated and Shayban slain, though Yahya was also killed.

=== Battle of Julfar ===
Shortly afterwards, the Abbasid army under Khazim landed in Julfar with the intent of capturing or killing Shayban. They were met by Ibadi reinforcements led by al-Julanda who had set camp outside the settlement. Khazim asked that al-Julanda submit to Abbasid suzerainty and hand over Shayban's ring and sword so it could be presented to the caliph. The Ibadi ulama advised al-Julanda to offer Khazim some money and Shayban's possessions. This was rejected by Khazim, who demanded the Ibadis swear allegiance to the caliph and read out the Friday khutbah in his name. The request was intolerable for the Ibadis, and both sides prepared for battle.

Their first encounter ended in a decisive victory for al-Julanda's forces, with the Abbasid army suffering heavy casualties. On the following day, the two armies clashed indecisively; al-Tabari reports the Abbasid army killed over 900 Ibadis and burned a further 90 to death. The two sides then rested for several days. According to al-Tabari, Khazim ordered his troops to burn down the dwellings of al-Julanda's soldiers in Julfar, which were constructed from wood. Al-Julanda's forces routed to save their families and the imam was killed.

With al-Julanda and his forces defeated, the imamate was conquered by 752. The region was subsequently governed by the Abbasids until a revolt in 793 revived the imamate under Muhammad bin Affan.
