= Omani Civil War =

There have been three civil wars in Omani history:

- Omani Civil War (1718-1744)
- Jebel Akhdar War
- Dhofar rebellion

== See also ==
- List of wars involving Oman
