= Abd al-Aziz ibn Umar ibn Abd al-Aziz =

Umayyad governor of Medina from 744 to 747

Abd al-Aziz ibn Umar ibn Abd al-Aziz عبد العزيز بن عمر بن عبد العزيز

Governor of Medina and Mecca
- In office 744–747
- Monarchs: Yazid III, Ibrahim, Marwan II
- Preceded by: Abd al-Aziz ibn Abdallah ibn Amr
- Succeeded by: Abd al-Wahid ibn Sulayman

Personal details
- Born: 700s Umayyad Caliphate
- Died: 750s Harran/Damascus, Umayyad Caliphate
- Parents: Umar II (father); Umm Shu'ayb al-Kalbi/Lamis bint Ali (mother)
- Relatives: Brothers:-: Abd Allah; Asim; Abd al-Rahman; Sulayman; Maslama; Zayd; Ubayd Allah; Uthman

Abd al-Aziz ibn Umar ibn Abd al-Aziz (Arabic: عبد العزيز بن عمر بن عبد العزيز) was the son of Umayyad caliph Umar II and governor of Medina from 744 to 747.

== Life ==
Abd al-Aziz was the son of Umar ibn Abd al-Aziz. He was named after his grandfather Abd al-Aziz ibn Marwan.

His father became caliph in 717 and ruled until his death in 720. He was succeeded by his cousin and brother-in-law Yazid II.

In 744 Abd al-Aziz was appointed as governor of Medina by caliph Yazid ibn al-Walid.

Abd al-Aziz remained as governor of Medina until he was dismissed by Marwan II and was replaced by his cousin Abd al-Wahid ibn Sulayman in 747.

== Sources ==
- Khalifah ibn Khayyat (1985). al-Umari, Akram Diya' (ed.). Tarikh Khalifah ibn Khayyat (in Arabic) (3rd ed.). Al-Riyadh: Dar Taybah.
- Yarshater, Ehsan, ed. (1985–2007). The History of al-Ṭabarī (40 vols). SUNY Series in Near Eastern Studies. Albany, New York: State University of New York Press. ISBN 978-0-7914-7249-1.
- McMillan, M.E. (2011). The Meaning of Mecca: The Politics of Pilgrimage in Early Islam. London: Saqi. ISBN 978-0-86356-437-6.
- Al-Ya'qubi, Ahmad ibn Abu Ya'qub (1883). Houtsma, M. Th. (ed.). Historiae, Vol. 2. Leiden: E. J. Brill.
