= Abu Hamza al-Mukhtar =

Abu Hamza al-Mukhtar ibn Awf al-Azdi al-Salimi (Arabic: أبو حمزة المختار بن عوف الأزدي السليمي) was an Ibadi Kharijite rebel leader who seized control of Mecca and Medina during the Ibadi revolt.

== Life ==
Al-Mukhtar hailed from Basra, and according to the history of al-Tabari was an opponent of the Umayyad Caliphate: "He would go each year to Mecca calling on people to oppose [Caliph Marwan II] and the Marwanids". He was a prominent member of the Ibadi Kharijite movement in Basra, headed by Abu Ubayda Muslim ibn Abi Karima, who sent him to Hadramawt, where the qadi Abdallah ibn Yahya al-Kindi was gaining prominence. Al-Mukhtar and other agents were sent to Abdallah to encourage him to revolt against the Umayyads.

Abdallah rose in revolt in 746, rapidly seizing control of the Hadramawt and Yemen. In mid-747, at the time of the Hajj pilgrimage, Abdallah entrusted al-Mukhtar with some 900–1,000 strong, and sent him to occupy the two Islamic holy cities of Mecca and Medina. Al-Mukhtar seized Mecca in August 747 without a fight, but before Medina was opposed by a local force, which he defeated with great loss of life in October 747.

The expansion of the Ibadi uprising worried the Umayyad caliph Marwan II, who in January 748 sent his general, Abd al-Malik ibn Atiyya, to suppress it with 4,000 troops. The Umayyad general defeated and killed Abu Hamza before Medina and retook control of the Hejaz.

== Sources ==
- Francesca, Ersilia (2004). "Ṭālib al-Ḥaḳḳ". In Bearman, P. J.; Bianquis, Th.; Bosworth, C. E.; van Donzel, E. & Heinrichs, W. P. (eds.). The Encyclopaedia of Islam, Second Edition. Volume XII: Supplement. Leiden: E. J. Brill. pp. 785–786. doi:10.1163/1573-3912_islam_SIM_8920. ISBN 978-90-04-13974-9.
- Landau-Tasseron, Ella (2010). "Arabia". In Robinson, Chase F. (ed.). The New Cambridge History of Islam, Volume 1: The Formation of the Islamic World, Sixth to Eleventh Centuries. Cambridge: Cambridge University Press. pp. 397–447. ISBN 978-0-521-83823-8.
- Williams, John Alden, ed. (1985). The History of al-Ṭabarī, Volume XXVII: The ʿAbbāsid Revolution, A.D. 743–750/A.H. 126–132. SUNY Series in Near Eastern Studies. Albany, New York: State University of New York Press. ISBN 978-0-87395-884-4.
