= Abd al-Aziz ibn Abdallah ibn Amr ibn Uthman =

Abd al-Aziz ibn Abdallah ibn Amr ibn Uthman (died 19 October 747) was an Umayyad nobleman, descendant of Caliph Uthman, who governed Mecca under the Umayyad caliphs Yazid III and Marwan II. He died leading a troop from Medina against the Kharijites at the Battle of Qudayd during the Ibadi revolt in 747.

== Family background ==
Abd al-Aziz was a great-grandson of the Rashidun caliph Uthman (r. 644–656) and grandson of Amr ibn Uthman, a noble of Medina. Among Uthman's descendants, Amr and his children maintained especially close ties with the successive Sufyanid and Marwanid ruling lines of the Umayyad family, to which they belonged. Abd al-Aziz's parents were Abdallah ibn Amr and a daughter of another Umayyad, Abdallah ibn Khalid ibn Asid. Abd al-Aziz's sister, Umm Abd al-Malik, was a wife of Caliph al-Walid I (r. 705–715) and his daughter, Izza, was also married to al-Walid I and after the latter's death, his brother Bakkar.

== Career and death ==
Abd al-Aziz was based in Medina and served as the governor of Mecca and Ta'if in 744 under Caliph Yazid III (r. 744–744) and again under Caliph Marwan II (r. 744–750). During the Kharijite revolt against the Umayyads in 747, Abd al-Aziz was appointed by Medina's governor, Abd al-Wahid ibn Sulayman, to lead the city's men, mostly drawn from the Quraysh tribe to which the Umayyads belonged, against the Kharijites under Abu Hamza. On 19 October 747, the two sides met at Qudayd, a halting place between Mecca and Medina, where the Kharijites routed the Medinans and many Qurayshites were killed. Abd al-Aziz was among the slain, along with his son Abd al-Jabbar, brother Umayya (who was Marwan II's tax collector of the Bedouin tribes of Tayy and Asad), and cousin Hatim ibn al-Mughira ibn Anbasa ibn Uthman.

== Bibliography ==
- Ahmed, Asad Q. (2011). The Religious Elite of the Early Islamic Ḥijāz: Five Prosopographical Case Studies. Oxford: University of Oxford Linacre College Unit for Prosopographical Research. ISBN 978-1-900934-13-8.
- Williams, John Alden, ed. (1985). The History of al-Ṭabarī, Volume XXVII: The ʿAbbāsid Revolution, A.D. 743–750/A.H. 126–132. SUNY Series in Near Eastern Studies. Albany, New York: State University of New York Press. ISBN 978-0-87395-884-4.
