= Raja ibn Haywa =

Muslim theological and Umayyad political adviser

- رَجَاء بْنِ حَيْوَة
- Born: c. 660; Beisan (Beit She'an), Jordan district
- Died: Qussin, Kufa
- Known for: Muslim theologian Adviser of Umayyad caliphs Played role in Dome of the Rock construction in Jerusalem
- Father: Haywa ibn Khanzal

Adviser of Abd al-Malik
- In office 685–705

Political adviser for al-Walid I
- In office 705–715

Adviser for Sulayman
- In office 715–717

Adviser for Umar
- In office 717–720

Raja ibn Haywa al-Kindi (Arabic: رَجَاء بْنِ حَيْوَة الكِنْدِيّ, romanized: Rajaʾ ibn Ḥaywa al-Kindī) was a prominent Muslim theological and political adviser of the Umayyad caliphs Abd al-Malik (r. 685–705), al-Walid I (r. 705–715), Sulayman (r. 715–717) and Umar (r. 717–720). He was a staunch defender of the religious conduct of the caliphs against their pious detractors. He played an important role in the construction of the Dome of the Rock in Jerusalem under Abd al-Malik. He became a mentor of Sulayman during the latter's governorship of Palestine and his secretary or chief scribe during his caliphate. Raja played an influential role in securing the succession of Umar over Sulayman's brothers or sons and continued as a secretary to the new caliph. He spent the last decade of his life in retirement, though he maintained contact with Caliph Hisham (r. 724–743).

== Early life ==
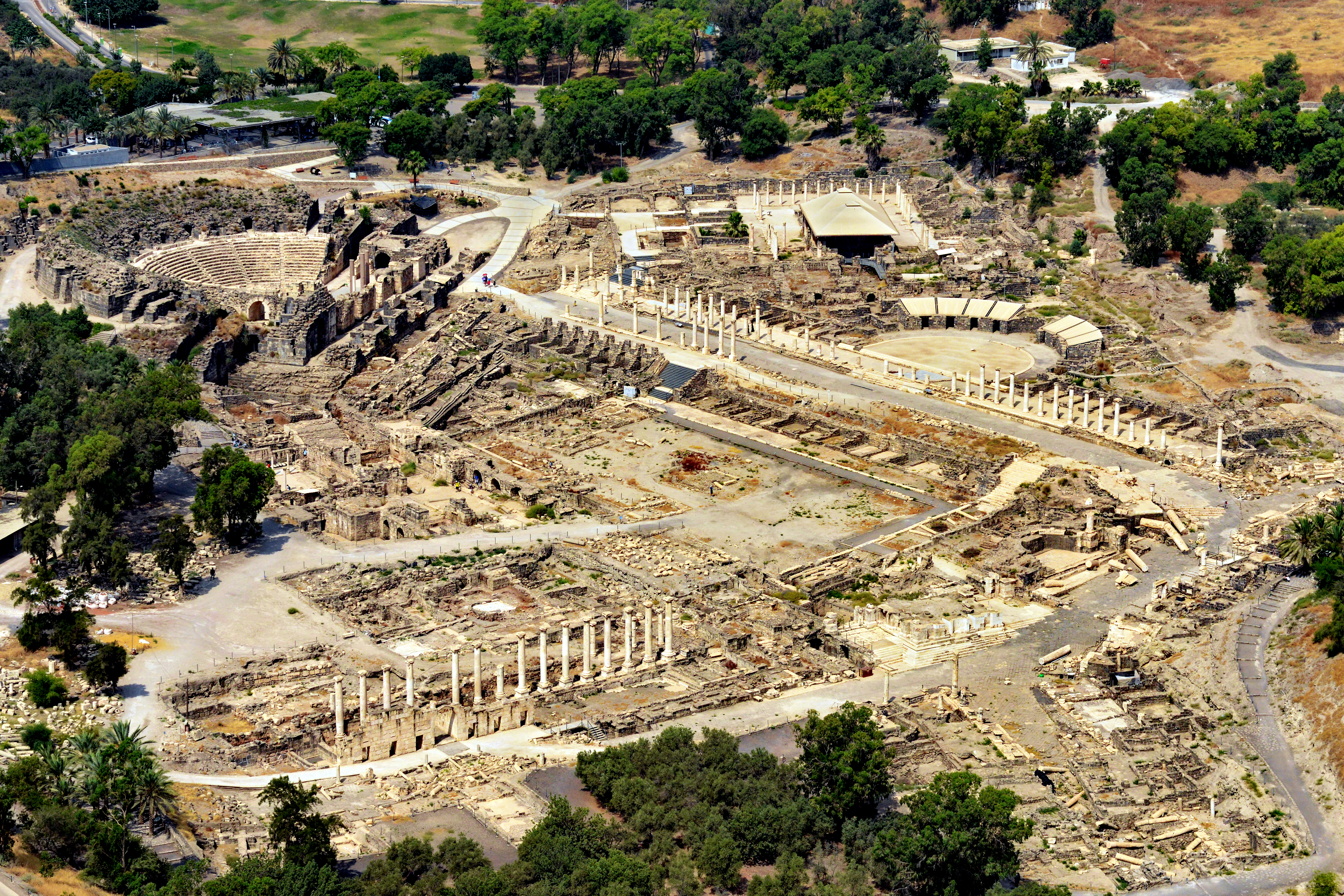
The ancient ruins of Beisan, Raja's hometown

Raja, known also by his kunya "Abū al-Miqdām" or "Abū Naṣr", was the son of Haywa ibn Khanzal. He was born in Beisan (Beit She'an), in the Jordan district, before moving south to the district of Palestine. According to a report traced to Raja and recorded by the historian al-Suyuti (d. 1505), Raja considered himself a Jerusalemite. His approximate year of birth was c. 660, during the early reign of the first Umayyad caliph, Mu'awiya I (r. 661–680).

The 9th-century historian Khalifa ibn Khayyat mentions that Raja was a mawlā (non-Arab, Muslim client or freedman) of the Kinda tribe. The modern historian Michael Lecker considers his mawla status as a reasonable possibility, but also holds there is good evidence that Raja was of actual Kindite descent, due to the existence of his full genealogy, which places him as a great-grandson of the Kindite tribesman Imru al-Qays ibn Abis, a contemporary of the first caliph Abu Bakr. Moreover, Imru al-Qays and Raja both lived in Baysan, the former in his later life and Raja in his youth. Because of his family's residence in the Palestine or Jordan district of Syria, Raja is occasionally given the nisba (epithet) of al-Filasṭīnī ("the Palestinian") or al-Urdunnī ("the Jordanian"). The family likely hailed from or settled in an area inhabited by their Kindite tribal kin or patrons, whose prominence in Syria had grown under Mu'awiya and further still under Caliph Marwan I (r. 684–685).

== Career under the Umayyad caliphs ==
=== Association with the Dome of the Rock ===
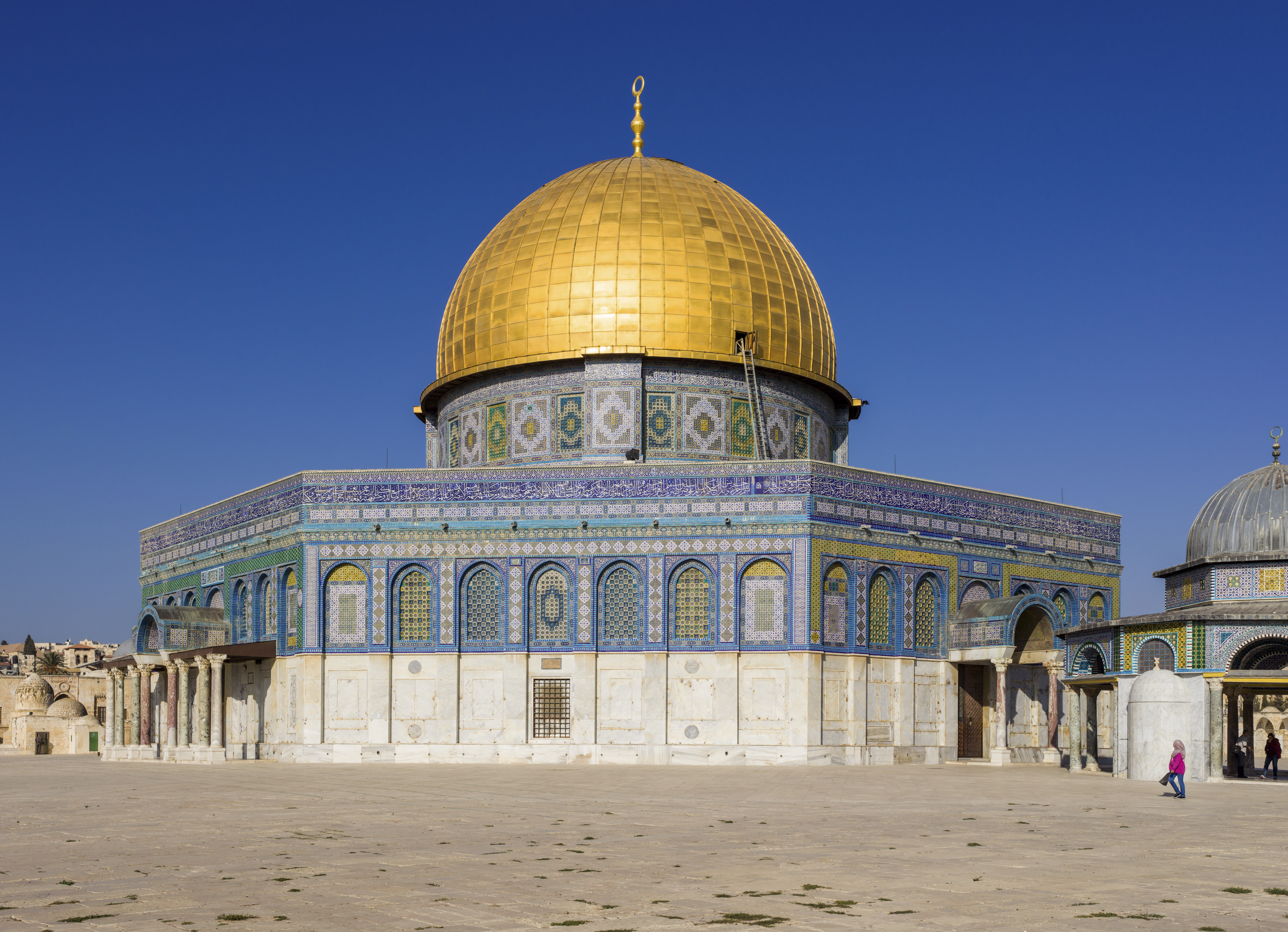
Raja played a key role in the construction of the Dome of the Rock in Jerusalem

It was likely through the patronage of the Kindites in the caliphs' courts in Syria that Raja gained favor with the Umayyads, particularly Marwan's son and successor, Abd al-Malik (r. 685–705). The latter entrusted Raja and his own Jerusalemite mawlā, Yazid ibn Sallam, with overseeing the financing of the Dome of the Rock's construction in Jerusalem. It is possible this was the reason for Raja's relocation to Palestine from the Jordan district and his new title sayyid ahl Filaṣtin (leader of the people of Palestine). Raja's role in its construction is described in the earliest known Muslim literary work specifically dedicated to the merits of Jerusalem, the Faḍāʿil al-Bayt al-Muqaddas written by the Jerusalemite preacher Abu Bakr Muhammad ibn Ahmad al-Wasiti before 1019. Raja and Yazid were instructed by the caliph to spend generously on the building's construction and ornamentation. In an account recorded by the 15th-century Palestine-based historian Mujir ad-Din al-Ulaymi, Raja and Yazid informed Abd al-Malik that after the Dome of the Rock's completion there remained a surplus of 100,000 gold dinars in the construction budget. The caliph offered them the sum as an additional reward for their efforts, but both men refused; as a result, Abd al-Malik ordered that the coins be melted to gild the building's dome.

The historian Nasser Rabbat speculates Raja played a greater role in the founding of the Dome of the Rock, beyond fiscally managing its construction. He proposes that Raja advised Abd al-Malik to choose the site of the Dome of the Rock on the Temple Mount and formulated the Qur'anic inscriptions which decorate the structure's interior and exterior. He bases this theory on Raja's senior position in the Umayyad court, knowledge of the Qur'an, social connection to Palestine, expertise about the holy sites of Jerusalem, and his important role in developing the early Muslim tradition about Jerusalem's sanctity.

=== Adviser of Abd al-Malik ===
Toward the end of the Dome of the Rock's completion in 691/92, Raja was assigned by Abd al-Malik to a joint embassy with the up-and-coming commander al-Hajjaj ibn Yusuf to negotiate a reconciliation with Zufar ibn al-Harith al-Kilabi, the leader of a tribal rebellion in Upper Mesopotamia. Raja displayed his moderate disposition by praying alongside Zufar when al-Hajjaj refused to do so. According to al-Baladhuri, Raja later interceded with Abd al-Malik to pardon the rebels who had participated in the mass anti-Umayyad, Iraqi rebellion of Ibn al-Ash'ath, a prominent Kufa-based Kindite, in 700–701.

=== Secretary of Sulayman and Umar ===
When Abd al-Malik appointed his son Sulayman governor of Palestine, he assigned Raja as his mentor. Raja accompanied Abd al-Malik's son and successor al-Walid I (r. 705–715) on the Hajj pilgrimage to Mecca and Medina in 710. By the time Sulayman acceded to the caliphate in 715, Raja had gained a reputation as the ascetic of the Umayyads and the "outstanding man of religion of his age for Syria", according to Bosworth. He related traditions from certain companions of the Islamic prophet Muhammad, including Mu'awiya, Jabir ibn Abd Allah, Abu Umama al-Bahili and Abd Allah ibn Umar, which were, in turn, related by numerous later Muslim traditionists. In a quote attributed to Sulayman's brother Maslama, the head Umayyad commander on the Byzantine front, "through Raja and his likes, we are rendered victorious". In a testament to Raja's loyalty to the Umayyad caliphs Sa'id ibn Jubayr (d. 714) stated, Raja "used to be regarded as the most knowledgeable jurist (faqih) in Syria, but if you provoke him, you will find him Syrian in his views quoting Abd al-Malik ibn Marwan saying such-and-such."

Raja served as Sulayman's chief kātib (secretary or scribe) and head of the administration of justice. He is credited by the Mamluk historian Ibn Fadlallah al-Umari for advising Sulayman, while he was governor of Palestine, to select the site of Ramla as the new capital of Islamic Palestine, replacing nearby Lydda (Lod). According to the traditional Muslim historians, Raja played an influential role in securing the succession of Sulayman's paternal cousin, the son of Abd al-Aziz ibn Marwan, Umar, to the caliphate over expectations in the Umayyad ruling family that one of Sulayman's brothers or sons would accede. In the account of the historian al-Waqidi (d. 823), while Sulayman was on his deathbed at his army camp in Dabiq during the major offensive against the Byzantines in 717, Sulayman's succession became a pressing issue. Abd al-Malik had formally designated al-Walid and Sulayman as his successors, but did not specify anyone beyond them; nonetheless, his intention that the office of the caliphate remain in the hands of his direct descendants was common knowledge in the ruling family. Sulayman's chosen successor, his eldest son Ayyub, had predeceased him and the ill caliph debated potential replacements with Raja.

The two Umayyad factions present at Dabiq were an anonymous group of Sulayman's inner circle represented by Raja and the family of Abd al-Malik, apparently represented by the caliph's brother Hisham. The latter faction favored another of Sulayman's brothers, Yazid II, who was away on the Hajj pilgrimage, to succeed, while the former favored Umar. In al-Waqidi's accounts, which are ultimately traced back to Raja's own account of the events, Raja persuaded Sulayman to bypass his own sons and brothers in favor of Umar. Raja was chosen to execute Sulayman's will. He secured the decision by securing oaths of allegiance from the Umayyad family to Sulayman's willed successor whose name was kept secret in a sealed letter. Once he gained their oaths, Umar was revealed as the next caliph and Yazid II as the next in line. He threatened the use of force against Sulayman's brothers following their protestations at being bypassed. Raja's role in the affair is considered to be a likely exaggeration by the modern historian Reinhard Eisener because of the personal account of Raja was the original authority for the early Muslim sources.

Raja first met Umar during the Hajj pilgrimage of 710, when Umar served as governor of Medina for al-Walid. During Umar's caliphate (717–720), Raja was one of the caliph's three kātibs. Although Raja may have functioned as a secretary of Sulayman and Umar, there is no evidence that he was ever a copyist, adhering to a specific set of stylizations of the sort visible at the Dome of the Rock, or that a group of such copyists flourished in Palestine in the time of Abd al-Malik. There is a lack of precise information about contributions of Raja, if any, to the well-documented administrative reforms of Umar.

== Retirement and death ==
Following the death of Umar, Raja likely entered retirement. According to the medieval Persian historian Abu Nu'aym al-Isfahani (d. 1038), he refused to accompany Umar's successor, Caliph Yazid II (r. 720–724) on the latter's visit to Jerusalem. After Caliph Hisham (r. 724–743) wrote to Raja expressing regret about his executions of the Qadari (at the time a theological school of Islam that asserted humans possessed free will) scholars Ghaylan al-Dimashqi and Salih Qubba, Raja wrote back supporting Hisham's decision; the executed scholars had been known political dissidents during the reign of Raja's patron, Umar. According to the medieval historian Ibn al-Athir (d. 1233), Raja died in Qussin, a place in Kufa's environs. Bosworth surmises that Raja ended up there possibly as part of the entourage of the Umayyad governor of Iraq, Khalid al-Qasri.

== Bibliography ==
- Bosworth, C. E. (1982). Medieval Arabic Culture and Administration. Variorum Reprints. ISBN 0-86078-113-5.
- Bosworth, C. E. (2004). "Radjaʾ b. Ḥaywa". In Bearman, P. J.; Bianquis, Th.; Bosworth, C. E.; van Donzel, E. & Heinrichs, W. P. (eds.). The Encyclopaedia of Islam, Second Edition. Volume XII: Supplement. Leiden: E. J. Brill. pp. 682–683. ISBN 978-90-04-13974-9.
- Eisener, R. (1997). "Sulaymān b. ʿAbd al-Malik". In Bosworth, C. E.; van Donzel, E.; Heinrichs, W. P. & Lecomte, G. (eds.). The Encyclopaedia of Islam, Second Edition. Volume IX: San–Sze. Leiden: E. J. Brill. pp. 821–822. ISBN 978-90-04-10422-8.
- Elad, Amikam (1999). Medieval Jerusalem and Islamic Worship: Holy Places, Ceremonies, Pilgrimage (2nd ed.). Leiden: Brill. ISBN 90-04-10010-5.
- Elad, Amikam (2008). "Abd al-Malik and the Dome of the Rock: A further Examination of the Muslim Sources". Jerusalem Studies in Arabic and Islam. 35.
- Lecker, Michael (1998). Jews and Arabs in Pre- and Early Islamic Arabia. Ashgate.
- Lecker, Michael (November 1994). "Kinda on the Eve of Islam and during the "Ridda"". Journal of the Royal Asiatic Society. 4 (3): 333–356. doi:10.1017/S1356186300005964. JSTOR 25182938.
- Powers, David S., ed. (1989). The History of al-Ṭabarī, Volume XXIV: The Empire in Transition: The Caliphates of Sulaymān, ʿUmar, and Yazīd, A.D. 715–724/A.H. 96–105. SUNY Series in Near Eastern Studies. Albany, New York: State University of New York Press. ISBN 978-0-7914-0072-2.
- Rabbat, Nasser (1993). "The Dome of the Rock Revisited: Some Remarks on al-Wasiti's Accounts". Muqarnas. 10. Brill: 66–75. doi:10.2307/1523173. JSTOR 1523173.
- Shaban, M. A. (1971). Islamic History: Volume 1, AD 600-750 (AH 132): A New Interpretation. Cambridge: Cambridge University Press. ISBN 0-521-08137-8.
