= List of wars involving Oman =

This is a list of wars involving the Sultanate of Oman and its predecessor states.

Conflict	Combatant 1	Combatant 2	Result
Battle of Julfar (752)	Imamate of Oman	Abbasid Caliphate	Defeat: Abbasid Caliphate kills Al-Julanda bin Masud
Siege of Mombasa (1696–1698)	Omani Empire	(Kingdom of Portugal) Portuguese Empire	Omani victory
1717 Omani invasion of Bahrain (1717)	(Muscat and Oman) Omani Empire: Al Bin Ali mercenaries	Safavid Empire	Omani victory: Omani Empire ended the Safavid rule over Bahrain
Omani Civil War (1718–1744)	Saif bin Sultan II Loyalists: Ghafiris (1718 - 1722); Hinawis (after 1728)	Opposition: Hinawis (1718 - 1722); Ghafiris (after 1722)	Inconclusive: Collapse of the Ya'rubid Dynasty; Establishment of the Al Bu Said Dynasty
Saudi invasion of Qatar	Qatar; Bahrain; Oman; Ottoman Empire	Diriyah	Defeat: Incorporation of Qatar into First Saudi State
Oman–Zanzibar war (1784)	Omani Empire	Local forces from Zanzibar, Mombasa and Pemba Island	Victory: Defeat of rebels
Persian Gulf campaign of 1819 (1819)	United Kingdom: East India Company; Supported by Omani Empire	Ras Al Khaimah: Al-Qawasim	British victory: Hassan bin Rahma Al Qasimi deposed; Sultan bin Saqr al-Qasimi restored as ruler; Signing of the General Maritime Treaty of 1820
Bani Bu Ali expedition (1820–21)	East India Company; Omani empire; British Empire (until 1820)	Bani Bu Ali tribe	Victory: Bani Bu Ali defeated
Muscat rebellion (1913-1920)	British Empire; Muscat and Oman	Imamate of Oman; Supported by: German Empire (1915-1918)	Stalemate: Treaty of Seeb
Buraimi dispute (1952–1955)	Trucial Emirates: Emirate of Abu Dhabi; British Empire; Supported by Sultanate of Muscat and Oman; Aden Protectorate	Saudi Arabia; Supported by: Al Bu Shamis tribe; Na'im tribe	Decisive Trucial Oman Scouts victory: Surrender of Saudi forces; Ceasefire agreement with Bedouin tribes; Saudi Arabia withdraws and Oman regains control of Na'im and Al Bu Shamis, Buraimi and Hamasah; Emirate of Abu Dhabi consolidates control of Al Ain; Start of the Saudi Arabia – United Arab Emirates border dispute
Arab Cold War (1952–1991 (Note: Some sources variously date the end of the period to c.1979 or F1990, particularly Yemeni unification, the end of the Lebanese Civil War, the Gulf War or the end of the Western Sahara War. Some sources say ongoing.))	Saudi Arabia; Kingdom of Iraq (until 1958); Ba'athist Iraq (1979–1990); Jordan; Morocco; Kingdom of Egypt (until 1953); Arab Republic of Egypt (since 1974); Syria (before 1954, 1961–1963); Right Wing of Fatah; Libya (until 1969); Federation of the Emirates of South Arabia / Federation of South Arabia (until 1967); Protectorate of South Arabia (until 1967); Kingdom of Yemen (until 1970); North Yemen (1970–1974, since 1978); Muscat and Oman (until 1970); Imamate of Oman (until 1959); Oman (since 1970); (Sultanate of Zanzibar) Zanzibar (until 1964); Bahrain; Kuwait; Qatar; Somalia (since 1977); Sudan (before 1969, since 1985); Trucial States (until 1971); United Arab Emirates (from 1971); Muslim Brotherhood; Arab Federation (1958): Iraq; Jordan; Supported by: United States; United Kingdom; France; Republic of China; People's Republic of China (from 1972; limited); Afghan mujahideen (from 1979); Canada; Ethiopia (until 1974); West Germany; Iran (until 1979); Italy; Japan; South Korea; Pakistan; Turkey; CENTO (until 1979)	Republic of Egypt (1953–1958); United Arab Republic (1958–1971); Arab Republic of Egypt (1971–1973); Iraqi Republic (1958–1968); Ba'athist Iraq (1968–1979, 1990−1991); Syrian Republic (1954–1958/1961); Ba'athist Syria (from 1963); Libya (after 1969); Algeria; Sudan (1969–1971); South Yemen; North Yemen (1962–1970, 1974–1978); Mauritania (until 1984); Palestine Liberation Organization; Abu Nidal Organization; Polisario Front / Sahrawi Arab Democratic Republic; Somalia (1969–1977); Arab Nationalist Movement; Ba'ath Party (until 1966); DLF (1963–1968); PFLOAG (1968–1974); NDFLOAG (1969–1971); PFLO (1974–1976); Hezbollah (from 1985); Federation of Arab Republics; Arab Islamic Republic United Arab States (1958–1961): United Arab Republic; Kingdom of Yemen; Supported by: Soviet Union (until 1989); People's Republic of China (until 1972); Afghanistan (from 1978); Bulgaria (until 1989); Cuba (since 1959); Czechoslovakia (until 1989); (Derg) Ethiopia (from 1974); East Germany; Hungary (until 1989); India (limited); Iran (from 1979; limited); North Korea; Poland (until 1989); Romania (until 1989; limited); Yugoslavia (limited)	Inconclusive: Decline of pan-Arabism and Nasserism after the death of Gamal Abdel Nasser; Rise of Wahhabism, Salafi jihadism, and Islamism after the death of Nasser; International propagation of Salafism and Wahhabism in several countries financed with Saudi oil exports; Creation of Gulf Cooperation Council; Failed attempts of an Arab Union: Arab Federation; United Arab Republic; United Arab States; Federation of Arab Republics; United Arab Kingdom; Union of Arab Republics; Arab Islamic Republic; Successful attempts of an Arab Union: Unity of seven Arab emirates to form UAE; Yemeni unification
Jebel Akhdar War (1954–1959)	Sultanate of Muscat; United Kingdom	Imamate of Oman; Supported by: Republic of Egypt; Saudi Arabia	Muscati victory: Defeat of the Imamate of Oman; 2073, 2238 and 2302 'Question of Oman' resolutions adopted by the UN General Assembly; Dissolution of the Imamate of Oman
Dhofar Rebellion (1963–1976)	Muscat and Oman (until 1970); Oman (from 1970); United Kingdom; Iran (From 1973); Jordan; Supported by: Saudi Arabia; Abu Dhabi	Dhofar Liberation Front (Note: It was renamed to the Popular Front for the Liberation of the Occupied Arabian Gulf in 1968, to the Popular Front for the Liberation of Oman and the Arabian Gulf after its merge with the NDFLOAG in 1971, and to the Popular Front for the Liberation of Oman in 1974); NDFLOAG (1969–1971); South Yemen; Supported by: Soviet Union; China; Iraq; Saudi Arabia (until 1965)	Omani-British-Iranian victory
Gulf War (1990–1991)	United States; United Kingdom; France; Saudi Arabia; Egypt; Kuwait; (United Nations) Coalition: Afghan mujahideen; Argentina; Australia; Bahrain; Bangladesh; Belgium; Canada; Czechoslovakia; Denmark; Germany; Greece; Honduras; Hungary; Italy; Japan; Luxembourg; Morocco; Netherlands; New Zealand; Niger; Norway; Oman; Pakistan; Philippines; Poland; Portugal; Qatar; Romania; Senegal; Sierra Leone; Singapore; South Korea; Spain; Sweden; Syria; Turkey; United Arab Emirates	Iraq	Coalition victory: State of Kuwait resumes self-governance over all Kuwaiti sovereign territory; Establishment of a demilitarized zone and construction of a separation barrier along the Iraq–Kuwait border
Operation Ocean Shield (2009–2016)	NATO: Denmark; United Kingdom; United States; France; Netherlands; Spain; Greece; Romania; Germany; Belgium; Canada; Italy; Portugal; Turkey; Norway; Non-NATO: Australia; China; Colombia; India; Indonesia; Japan; Malaysia; New Zealand; Oman; Pakistan; Peru; Philippines; Russia; Saudi Arabia; Seychelles; Singapore; South Africa; South Korea; Taiwan; Thailand; Ukraine; Yemen	Somali pirates	Allied victory
Iran War (2026–present)	United States; Israel; Attacked by Iran: Oman; Gulf Cooperation Council allies	Iran; Regional proxies	Ongoing: US and Israel launch joint campaign (Operation Epic Fury / Roaring Lion); Regional retaliatory strikes touch Omani infrastructure; Oman actively balances ties and facilitates secret negotiations
