= Talib al-Haqq =

Kharijite Rebel and leader of Umayyad era

Abu Yahya Abdallah ibn Yahya ibn Umar ibn al-Aswad ibn Abdallah ibn al-Harith ibn Mu'awiya ibn al-Harith al-Kindi, better known by his laqab of Talib al-Haqq (Arabic: طالب الحق, lit. 'Seeker of the Truth'), was the leader of an Ibadi revolt against the Umayyad Caliphate in southern Arabia during the Third Fitna.

== Life ==
Very little information is preserved about his life. He was born Abdallah ibn Yahya was of Kindaite origin, and had originally been appointed by the Umayyad governor of Yemen as a judge (qadi) in the eastern Hadramawt region. In this capacity he became renowned for his piety and strict interpretation of Islamic law, and won the sympathies of local anti-Umayyad elements. Abdallah was encouraged to rise up by Abu Ubayda Muslim ibn Abi Karima, the leader of the Ibadi Kharijite movement in Basra, who sent him money and arms, as well as two of his disciples, Abu Hamza al-Mukhtar and Balj ibn Uqba al-Azdi, for the purpose.

In late 745, as Umayyad authority was shaken by the outbreak of the Third Fitna, he proclaimed himself caliph. He secured the support from the Ibadis of neighbouring Oman, seized control of Hadramawt, and in 747 captured the Yemeni capital, Sana'a. There he distributed the provincial treasury to the local inhabitants and, while keeping the previous personnel in place, instituted a regime marked by its mildness and honest. As Ibadis from neighbouring regions flocked to his banner, he received the oath of allegiance as imam of the Ibadis, with the title of Talib al-Haqq. His followers are said to have numbered 30,000, although that figure may be just a conventional number indicating a large multitude rather than an accurate count.

In mid-747, an Ibadi army under Abu Hamza al-Mukhtar occupied the two Islamic holy cities of Mecca and Medina, and even Basra for a while swore allegiance to Talib al-Haqq as imam.

The expansion of the Ibadi uprising worried the Umayyad caliph Marwan II, the victor of the civil war. In January 748 Marwan sent his general, Abd al-Malik ibn Atiyya, to suppress it with 4,000 troops. The Umayyads defeated and killed Abu Hamza at Medina and retook control of the Hejaz, and in mid-748 invaded Yemen. Talib al-Haqq moved out of Sana'a and confronted the Umayyads at Jurash. In the ensuing battle, he was defeated and killed. His remaining followers fled to Shibam, while the severed head of the rebel leader was sent to Marwan.

Abd al-Malik ibn Atiyya completed the re-establishment of caliphal authority in Yemen, but as he was recalled soon after, was also forced to recognize the authority of the Ibadi remnants over Hadramawt under Aballlah ibn Sa'id al-Hadhrami. While ultimately unsuccessful, the Ibadi uprising also diverted crucial manpower away and facilitated Marwan's defeat in the Abbasid Revolution.

== Sources ==
- Francesca, Ersilia (2004). "Ṭālib al-Ḥaḳḳ". In Bearman, P. J.; Bianquis, Th.; Bosworth, C. E.; van Donzel, E. & Heinrichs, W. P. (eds.). The Encyclopaedia of Islam, Second Edition. Volume XII: Supplement. Leiden: E. J. Brill. pp. 785–786. doi:10.1163/1573-3912_islam_SIM_8920. ISBN 978-90-04-13974-9.
- Landau-Tasseron, Ella (2010). "Arabia". In Robinson, Chase F. (ed.). The New Cambridge History of Islam, Volume 1: The Formation of the Islamic World, Sixth to Eleventh Centuries. Cambridge: Cambridge University Press. pp. 397–447. ISBN 978-0-521-83823-8.
- Williams, John Alden, ed. (1985). The History of al-Ṭabarī, Volume XXVII: The ʿAbbāsid Revolution, A.D. 743–750/A.H. 126–132. SUNY Series in Near Eastern Studies. Albany, New York: State University of New York Press. ISBN 978-0-87395-884-4.
