= Abd al-Wahid ibn Sulayman =

Umayyad Prince and Governor of Hejaz (died c. 750)

Abd al-Wahid ibn Sulayman عبد الواحد بن سليمان

Governor of Medina and Mecca
- In office 747–748/749
- Monarch: Marwan II
- Preceded by: Abd al-Aziz ibn Umar ibn Abd al-Aziz
- Succeeded by: Muhammad ibn Abd al-Malik

Personal details
- Died: c. 750
- Cause of death: Killed by Abbasids
- Relations: Umayyad dynasty
- Children: Abd al-Malik; Abd al-Salam
- Parents: Sulayman (father); Umm Amr bint Abd Allah ibn Khalid ibn Asid (mother)
- Relatives: Cousins; Al-Walid II; Yazid III; Ibrahim

Abd al-Wahid ibn Sulayman ibn Abd al-Malik (Arabic: عبد الواحد بن سليمان بن عبد الملك, romanized: ʿAbd al-Wāḥid ibn Sulaymān ibn ʿAbd al-Malik; fl. 720 – c. 750) was an Umayyad prince and the governor of Mecca and Medina in 747–748 during the reign of Caliph Marwan II (r. 744–750). He fled the post in 747/48 after failing to prevent the takeover of the two Islamic holy cities by the Kharijites during the Ibadi revolt. He was later executed by the Abbasids after their toppling of the Umayyad dynasty.

== Early life ==
Abd al-Wahid was a son of Caliph Sulayman (r. 715–717) and a grandson of Caliph Abd al-Malik (r. 685–705). His mother, Umm Amr, a daughter of Abd Allah ibn Khalid ibn Asid, was one of the Umayyad wives of Sulayman.

According to a contemporary poem preserved in the 10th-century Kitab al-aghani (Book of Songs), Abd al-Wahid rewarded the Taghlibite poet al-Qutami (d. 747) with fifty camels loaded with wheat, dates and clothing for a panegyric praising the prince during the rule of Caliph Umar II (r. 717–720); Abd al-Wahid made the gift to al-Qutami shortly after hearing that Umar had refused to gift him the thirty camels al-Qutami had requested due to the caliph's apparent disdain for poetry.

== Governorship of Mecca and Medina ==
In 747 Abd al-Wahid was appointed the governor of Mecca and Medina by Caliph Marwan II (r. 744–750), his distant cousin. During the Hajj (annual Muslim pilgrimage to Mecca) in August 747, Kharijite rebels led by Abu Hamza al-Azdi entered Mecca and Abd al-Wahid entered a truce with them stipulating that each side could resume the Hajj in peace. As the two sides approached Mina, a closing stage of the Hajj, the Kharijites "pushed aside" Abd al-Wahid and the pilgrims he led, according to al-Tabari, leading the pilgrims to criticize the governor for not taking firmer action against Abu Hamza. Afterward, the latter encamped outside Mecca while Abd al-Wahid returned to the governor's palace in Mecca. Abd al-Wahid sent a delegation of Medinese nobles to persuade Abu Hamza to withdraw from the region, but Abu Hamza refused and Abd al-Wahid consequently abandoned Mecca to the Kharijites, who entered without a fight.

Upon returning to Medina, Abd al-Wahid mobilized an army of local volunteers and appointed to its command his distant kinsman, Abd al-Aziz ibn Abd Allah ibn Amr, a great-grandson of Caliph Uthman (r. 644–656). On their way to Mecca, the Medinese volunteers, who lacked military experience, were ambushed by the Kharijites at the village of Qudayd between Medina and Mecca and Abd al-Aziz was slain. The Kharijites subsequently entered Medina in late 747 or early 748, spurring Abd al-Wahid to flee for Syria, the center of the Umayyad Caliphate.

== Death and descendants ==
In the aftermath of the toppling of the Umayyads and invasion of Syria by the Abbasids in 750, Abd al-Wahid went into hiding among friendly Arab tribes until being pardoned and promised safety by the Abbasid authorities. Later that year, however, he was executed with numerous other Umayyads by the Abbasids in Jund Filastin (military district of Palestine) at a banquet at an estate along Nahr Abi Futrus (Antipatris river), in the village of Qalansawa, or in the court of the Abbasid caliph al-Saffah (r. 750–754). According to the last account, Abd al-Wahid was singled out and seated next to the Abbasid caliph in honor of certain favors Abd al-Wahid had once granted the Abbasid family; after the caliph ordered his guards to execute the other Umayyads brought to his court by bashing in their skulls with maces, he reportedly told Abd al-Wahid "there is no point in you staying alive after your people and your power have gone", but granted him the dignity of death by the sword.

A number of Umayyads fled the massacres of their family in Syria, Iraq, Egypt and Arabia and found refuge in al-Andalus (the Iberian Peninsula) where Abd al-Rahman I, a son of Abd al-Wahid's cousin Mu'awiya ibn Hisham, established the Cordoba-based Umayyad emirate in 756. The sources record a number of descendants of Abd al-Wahid's sons Abd al-Malik and Abd al-Salam playing active roles in the emirate, including a sixth-generation descendant of the former, Abd al-Malik ibn Muhammad al-Sulaymani (d. 970).

== Bibliography ==
- Avila, Maria Luisa (1985). La sociedad hispanomusulmana al final del califato: aproximación a un estudio demográfico. Madrid: Consejo Superior de Investigaciones Científicas. ISBN 84-00-06045-8.
- Bakhouch, Mohamed (2008–2009). "Le calife 'Umar b. 'Abd al-'Azīz et les poètes". Bulletin d'Études Orientales. 58: 161–204. JSTOR 41608619.
- Elad, Amikam (2000). "The Ethnic Composition of the 'Abbasid Revolution: A Reevaluation of Some Recent Research". Jerusalem Studies in Arabic and Islam. 24: 246–326.
- James, David (2012). A History of Early Al-Andalus: The Akhbar Majmu'a. London and New York: Routledge. ISBN 978-0-415-66943-6.
- Mayer, Tobias (2016) [2012]. "New Considerations on the Nomination of ʿUmar II by Sulaymān b. ʿAbd al-Malik". In Donner, Fred M.; Conrad, Lawrence I. (eds.). The Articulation of Early Islamic State Structures. New York and London: Routledge. ISBN 978-0-8607-8721-1.
- Robinson, Chase F. (2010). "The Violence of the Abbasid Revolution". In Suleiman, Yasir (ed.). Living Islamic History: Studies in Honour of Professor Carole Hillenbrand: Studies in Honour of Professor Carole Hillenbrand. Edinburgh: Edinburgh University Press. pp. 226–251. ISBN 978-0-7486-3738-6.
- Uzquiza Bartolomé, Aránzazu (1994). "Otros Linajes Omeyas en al-Andalus". In Marín, Manuela (ed.). Estudios onomástico-biográficos de Al-Andalus: V (in Spanish). Madrid: Consejo Superior de Investigaciones Científicas. pp. 445–462. ISBN 84-00-07415-7.
- Williams, John Alden, ed. (1985). The History of al-Ṭabarī, Volume XXVII: The ʿAbbāsid Revolution, A.D. 743–750/A.H. 126–132. SUNY Series in Near Eastern Studies. Albany, New York: State University of New York Press. ISBN 978-0-87395-884-4.
