= Ibadi revolt =

- Part of the Third Fitna
- Map of Arabia
Date	c. 747–748 AD
Location	Hadhramaut, Yemen and the Hejaz
Result	Umayyad victory
Territorial changes	Umayyad rule restored in the Hejaz and Yemen; continued Ibadi presence in Hadramawt

Belligerents
Umayyad Caliphate	Ibadi Kharijites

Commanders and leaders
Abd al-Malik ibn Muhammad ibn Atiyyah; Abd al-Wahid ibn Sulayman; Al-Qasim ibn Umar al-Thaqafi; Abd al-Aziz ibn Abdallah ibn Amr ibn Uthman †	Talib al-Haqq †; Abu Hamza al-Mukhtar †; Balj ibn Uqba al-Azdi †

The Ibadi revolt was an Ibadi Kharijite uprising that occurred in c. 747–748 against the Umayyad Caliphate. It established the first Ibadi imamate, a short-lived state located in the Arabian Peninsula.

Taking place during the tumultuous last years of Umayyad rule, the revolt initially broke out in Hadramawt in southern Arabia under the leadership of Abdallah ibn Yahya al-Kindi, who assumed the name of Talib al-Haqq. The rebels were able to occupy Sana'a in Yemen and then, under the command of Abu Hamza al-Mukhtar ibn Awf al-Azdi and Balj ibn Uqbah al-Azdi, seize control of the cities of Mecca and Medina and threaten the traditional Umayyad power base of Syria. A Syrian army led by Abd al-Malik ibn Muhammad ibn Atiyyah eventually restored Umayyad rule in the Hejaz and Sana'a and killed Abdallah ibn Yahya, Abu Hamza and Balj, but the remaining Ibadis were able to avoid total defeat when Ibn Atiyyah was recalled to Mecca.

Although the revolt failed to create a permanent Ibadi imamate, the sect was able to achieve some limited victories. As a result of the uprising, the Ibadis were allowed to retain their effective autonomy in Hadramawt, and they were to remain an influential force in southern Arabia for the next several centuries.

== Background ==
The Ibadis were members of a Kharijite sect formed in the seventh century. Centered in Basra in southern Iraq, they initially formed a moderate alternative to the more extremist elements of Kharijism, and sought to peaceably win over the Umayyad caliphs to their cause. By the second quarter of the eighth century, however, the prospect of a reconciliation with the Umayyads had become increasingly unlikely, and radical elements among the Ibadis eventually steered the sect toward active resistance against the ruling government. The Ibadis of Basra under Abu Ubayda began planning for the establishment of a universal Ibadi imamate, forming a treasury for their operations and training teams of adherents for missionary work. These teams were dispatched to the various provinces of the caliphate, where they were tasked with spreading Ibadi propaganda and creating enough support to ultimately facilitate a revolution against the Umayyads.

Following the death of Hisham ibn Abd al-Malik in 743, the Umayyads were beset by a series of disorders which posed a serious threat to their continued rule over the Muslim community. Infighting among the members of the Umayyad dynasty and tribal rivalries between the Qays and Yaman sapped the strength of the regime, and undermined its ability to deal with the outbreak of several rebellions throughout the provinces of the empire. The last Umayyad caliph Marwan II (r. 744–750) was forced to spend the first several years of his reign putting down revolts in Syria and Iraq and fighting against his relative Sulayman ibn Hisham, and was ultimately deposed by the Abbasid Revolution which put a complete end to the Umayyad Caliphate. The relative weakness of the Umayyads, along with their preoccupation with threats on multiple fronts, made the final years of their rule an ideal time for groups such as the Ibadis to attempt their own revolts against the dynasty.

== Outbreak of the revolt ==
During the reign of Marwan II, the Ibadis of Basra dispatched an agent named Abu Hamza al-Mukhtar ibn Awf al-Azdi to spread their message in Mecca and call on the people there to oppose the Umayyads. While undertaking his mission in Mecca, Abu Hamza was approached in 746 by Abdallah ibn Yahya al-Kindi, called Talib al-Haqq ("The Seeker of Justice"), who was the qadi of Hadramawt. Abdallah informed him that he approved of his cause and enjoyed the obedience of his people, and convinced Abu Hamza to come with him to Hadramawt to preach opposition against Marwan. The Ibadis of Basra, encouraged by the prospect of a revolt in Hadramawt, quickly threw their support behind Abdallah, and numerous Basrans arrived in the region to provide assistance.

In 746-7 Abdallah launched his revolt in Hadramawt, where he quickly overcame the local governor Ibrahim ibn Jabalah al-Kindi and secured his hold over the region. After formally receiving the oath of allegiance from the Hadrami and Basran Ibadis and being recognized as imam, he resolved to make an advance on Sana'a, the chief town of the Yemen, and set out with two thousand of his men. The town's governor, al-Qasim ibn Umar al-Thaqafi, attempted to stop the rebel offensive by marching against them with a much larger force, but he was defeated in the region of Abyan and forced to retreat back to Sana'a. The Ibadis soon reached the town and a second battle occurred, which ended with al-Qasim fleeing and many of the defenders killed; they then entered Sana'a and seized its wealth, and the town came under Abdallah's control.

== Occupation of Mecca and Medina ==
After spending several months in Sana'a, Abdallah sent Abu Hamza and Balj ibn Uqbah al-Azdi, both from Basra, to seize control of the Hejaz. They arrived in Mecca in August 747, during the pilgrimage season, and announced their opposition to the Umayyads. The governor of Mecca and Medina, Abd al-Wahid ibn Sulayman ibn Abd al-Malik, did not resist, allowing Abu Hamza to lead the pilgrimage on Abdallah's behalf. Abd al-Wahid then left for Medina, and the Ibadis took Mecca without a fight.

In a sermon in Medina, Abu Hamza clearly expressed the Ibadi view of both the Umayyads and the Shi'ites. He condemned the Umayyads, starting with Mu'awiya I and ending with Yazid II. He described the Umayyad rulers as tyrants who judged by whims, executed without justice, and misused public funds, disregarding the rightful recipients as specified in the Qur'an. He stated, "The sons of Umayya are a party of error... They make themselves the ninth class of people entitled to charity and take it all! Such are those who do not judge by what God has revealed."

Abu Hamza also criticized the Shi'ites, accusing them of distorting the teachings of the Qur'an and following superstition. He claimed they hoped for the resurrection of the dead and the return of their Imams, entrusting their faith to a man who could not even see them. He denounced them as misguided and perverse.

In the same sermon, Abu Hamza outlined the Ibadi cause, declaring that they called people to follow the Qur'an, the Prophet's Sunnah, and to justice and equal distribution of resources. He explained that the Ibadis did not take up arms for personal gain, revenge, or power, but because they saw widespread corruption, tyranny, and disregard for the law. They answered the call to truth and the straight path.

After Abd al-Wahid reached Medina, he organized the local army and sent it to fight the Ibadis, with Abd al-Aziz ibn Abdallah ibn Amr ibn Uthman leading the forces. Meanwhile, Abu Hamza appointed a deputy over Mecca and led his army north, with Balj commanding the vanguard. The Medinese army was defeated at Qudayd, where many, including Abd al-Aziz and several members of the Quraysh, were killed. With no opposition left, Abu Hamza entered Medina in October 747. Abd al-Wahid fled to Syria, and the city fell to the Kharijites.

== End of the revolt ==
Having secured control of both Mecca and Medina, the Ibadis next decided to head north to Syria, the former seat of the Umayyad caliphs. By this time, however, the activities of the rebels had prompted Marwan to take action against them, and a Syrian force of four thousand cavalry was dispatched to dislodge the Ibadis from the Hejaz. Abd al-Malik ibn Muhammad ibn Atiyyah was placed in command of the expedition and was ordered by the caliph to move quickly against Abu Hamza and Balj; if he succeeded in retaking the Hejaz, he was instructed to proceed to the Yemen and fight against Abdallah ibn Yahya as well.

Ibn Atiyyah accordingly made his way south until he encountered Balj, who had reached the Wadi al-Qura with an advance force on his way to Syria. A battle took place between the two sides, which ended with Balj and a large number of his men dead and the Syrians victorious. Ibn Atiyyah then proceeded to Medina, where the local residents had turned on and killed the Ibadis there after receiving the news of Balj's defeat, and reclaimed the city for the caliph. Abu Hamza, meanwhile, had retreated south to Mecca with the remaining rebels under his command, but Ibn Atiyyah soon caught up with and routed him. Abu Hamza himself died in the battle, together with a significant number of rebels, and the Ibadi position in the Hejaz was destroyed.

With the Hejaz now reconquered and controlled by his deputies, Ibn Atiyyah next headed for the Yemen, intending to combat Abdallah. The latter, receiving word of this advance, set out with a reported thirty thousand men from Sana'a to make his stand against the Syrians. The opposing forces met at Jurash, and after a long battle Ibn Atiyyah achieved another victory, killing Abdallah and defeating the Ibadis. Abdallah's head was sent to Marwan and Sana'a was reoccupied by Ibn Atiyyah.

Following the death of Abdallah, Ibn Atiyyah was forced to spend some time dealing with two Himyari uprisings in the area of al-Janad and the coastal regions of the Yemen. Once these were put down, he proceeded to Hadramawt, where Abdallah's former lieutenant Abdallah ibn Sa'id still led a large group of Ibadis. Ibn Atiyyah began to attack the rebels, but at this point he received a message from Marwan that he had been placed in charge of the pilgrimage for that year, necessitating his return to Mecca. Seeing no other choice, he quickly made peace with the Ibadis without defeating them, and departed from the region.

== Legacy ==
Although the revolt failed to fulfill the Ibadi goal of ultimately supplanting the Umayyads, it nevertheless marked the attempt of the Ibadis to create their own independent imamate. Over the following decades the Ibadis continued their revolutionary activities and established a number of additional movements throughout the Muslim world. Several of these eventually ended in long term gains for the sect, notably in Oman, where two Ibadi imamates (750–752 and 793–893) were formed, and in the Maghreb, where the Rustamid dynasty lasted for over a century.

The revolt also forced the already beleaguered Umayyad government to expend men and resources on a long and costly expedition in order to suppress it. This reduced the caliph's available military power and further weakened the dynasty in the face of the ongoing Abbasid Revolution, which overthrew the Umayyads in 750.

The strength of the revolt demonstrated the success of the Ibadis in converting the tribes of southern Arabia to their cause. The Ibadis remained a significant force in Hadramawt after the end of the uprising, and they represented a threat to caliphal security in the region until the reign of the second Abbasid caliph al-Mansur (r. 754–775). In 944 the majority of the Hadrami population was still considered to be adherents of Ibadism, and the sect likely remained influential in the province until the rise of the Sulayhid dynasty in the mid-eleventh century.
